= Anne-Louis Girodet de Roussy-Trioson =

French painter (1767–1824)

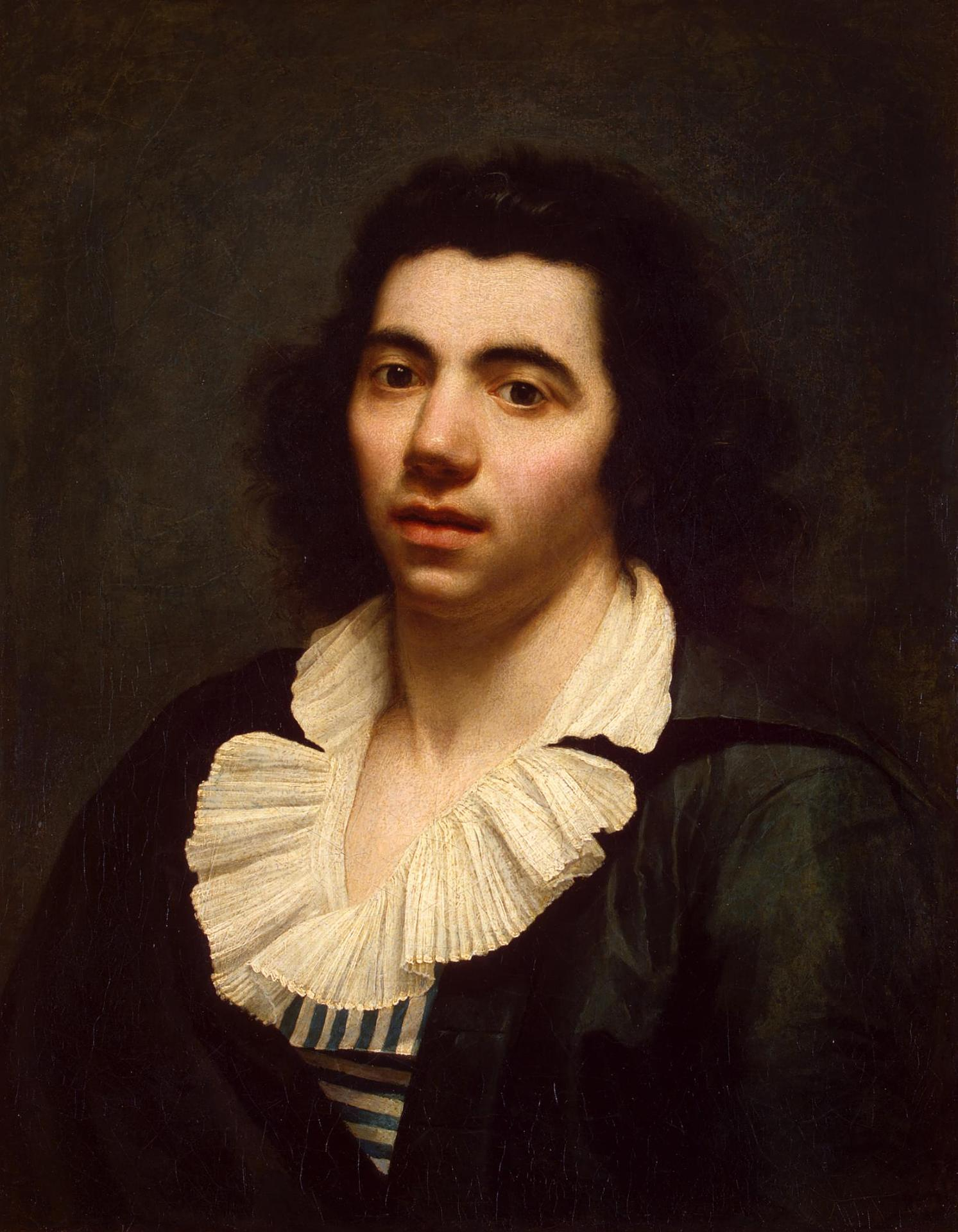
- Self-portrait, 1790
- Born: Anne-Louis Girodet de Roussy-Trioson; 29 January 1767; Montargis, Orléanais, France
- Died: 9 December 1824 (aged 57); Paris, France
- Resting place: Père Lachaise Cemetery
- Known for: Painting
- Notable work: Ossian receiving the ghosts of the fallen French Heroes, 1801; The Funeral of Atala, 1808; Portrait de Chateaubriand méditant sur les ruines de Rome, after 1808
- Movement: Neoclassicism, Romanticism

Signature
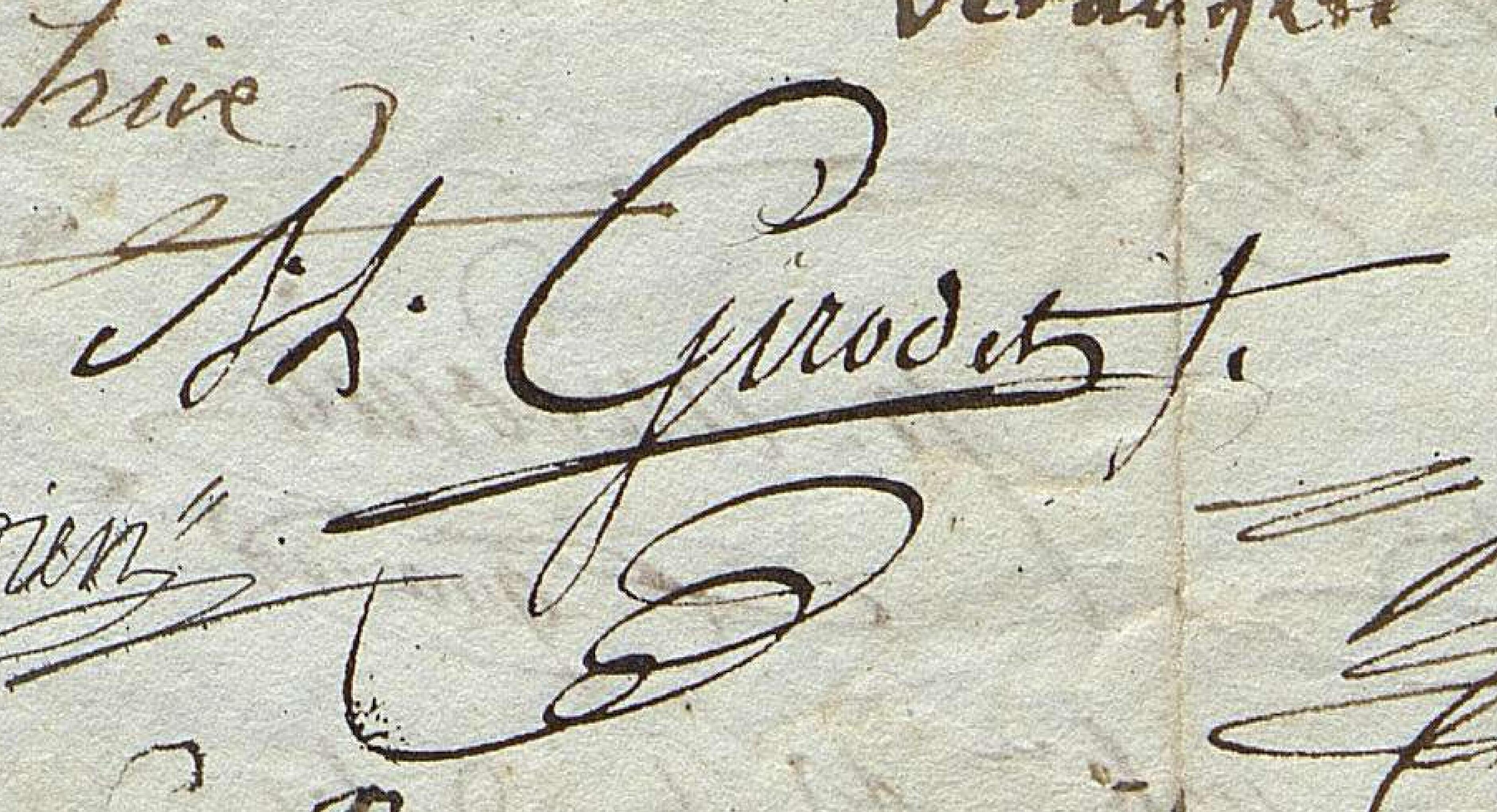

Anne-Louis Girodet de Roussy-Trioson (French pronunciation: [an lwi ʒiʁɔdɛ də ʁusi tʁijozɔ̃]; or de Roucy), also known as Anne-Louis Girodet-Trioson or simply Girodet (29 January 1767 – 9 December 1824), was a French painter and pupil of Jacques-Louis David, who participated in the early Romantic movement by including elements of eroticism in his paintings. Girodet is remembered for his precise and clear style and for his paintings of members of the Napoleonic family.

== Early career ==
Girodet was born at Montargis. Both of his parents died when he was a young adult. The care of his inheritance and education fell to his guardian, a prominent physician named Benoît-François Trioson, "médecin-de-mesdames", who later adopted him. The two men remained close throughout their lives and Girodet took the surname Trioson in 1812. In school he first studied architecture and pursued a military career. He changed to the study of painting under a teacher named Luquin and then entered the school of Jacques-Louis David. At the age of 22 he successfully competed for the Prix de Rome with a painting of the Story of Joseph and his Brethren. From 1789 to 1793 he lived in Italy and while in Rome he painted his Hippocrate refusant les presents d'Artaxerxes and Endymion-dormant (now in the Louvre), a work which gained him great acclaim at the Salon of 1793 and secured his reputation as a leading painter in the French school.

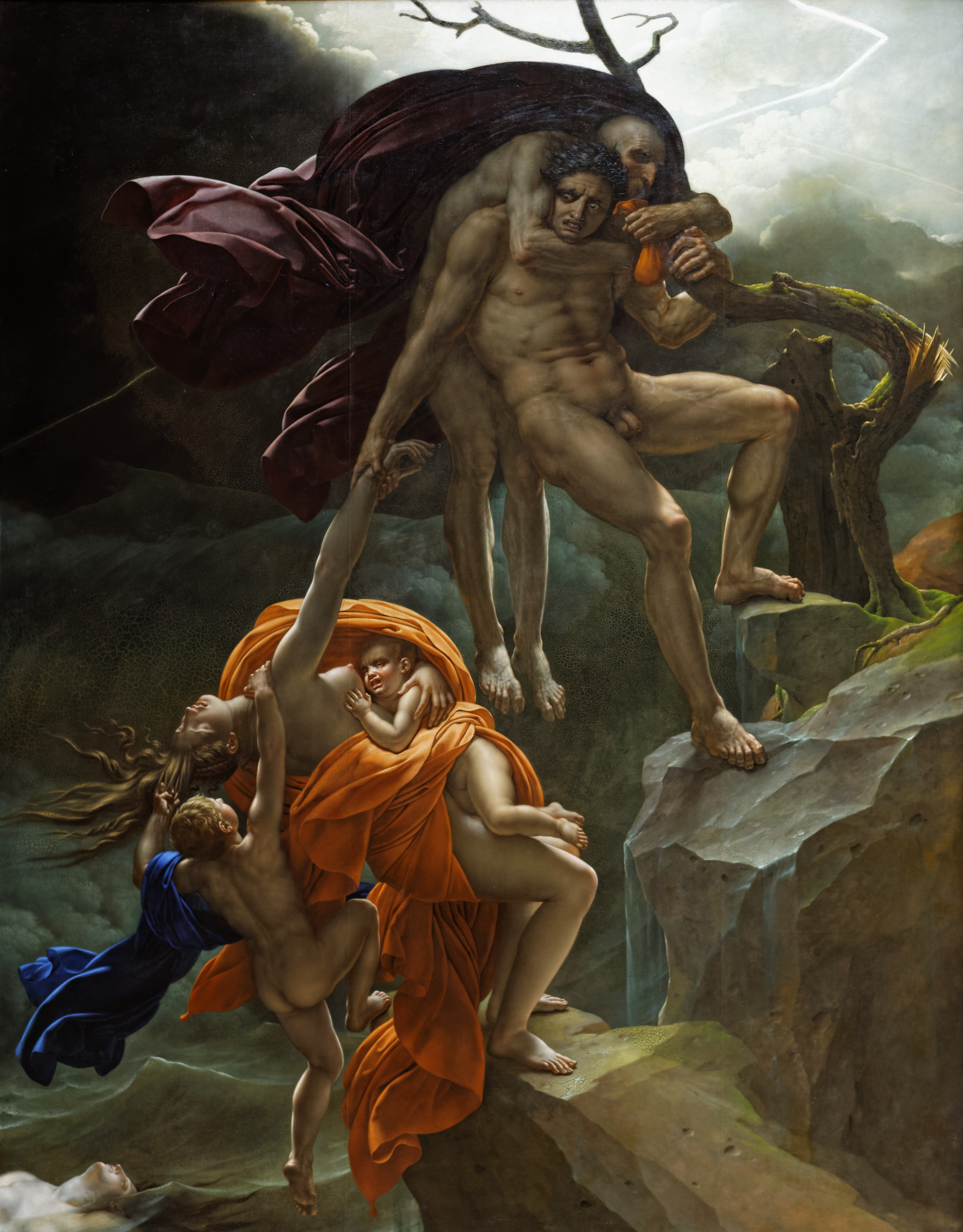
Scene from a Deluge (Une scène de déluge), 1806, Louvre, Paris

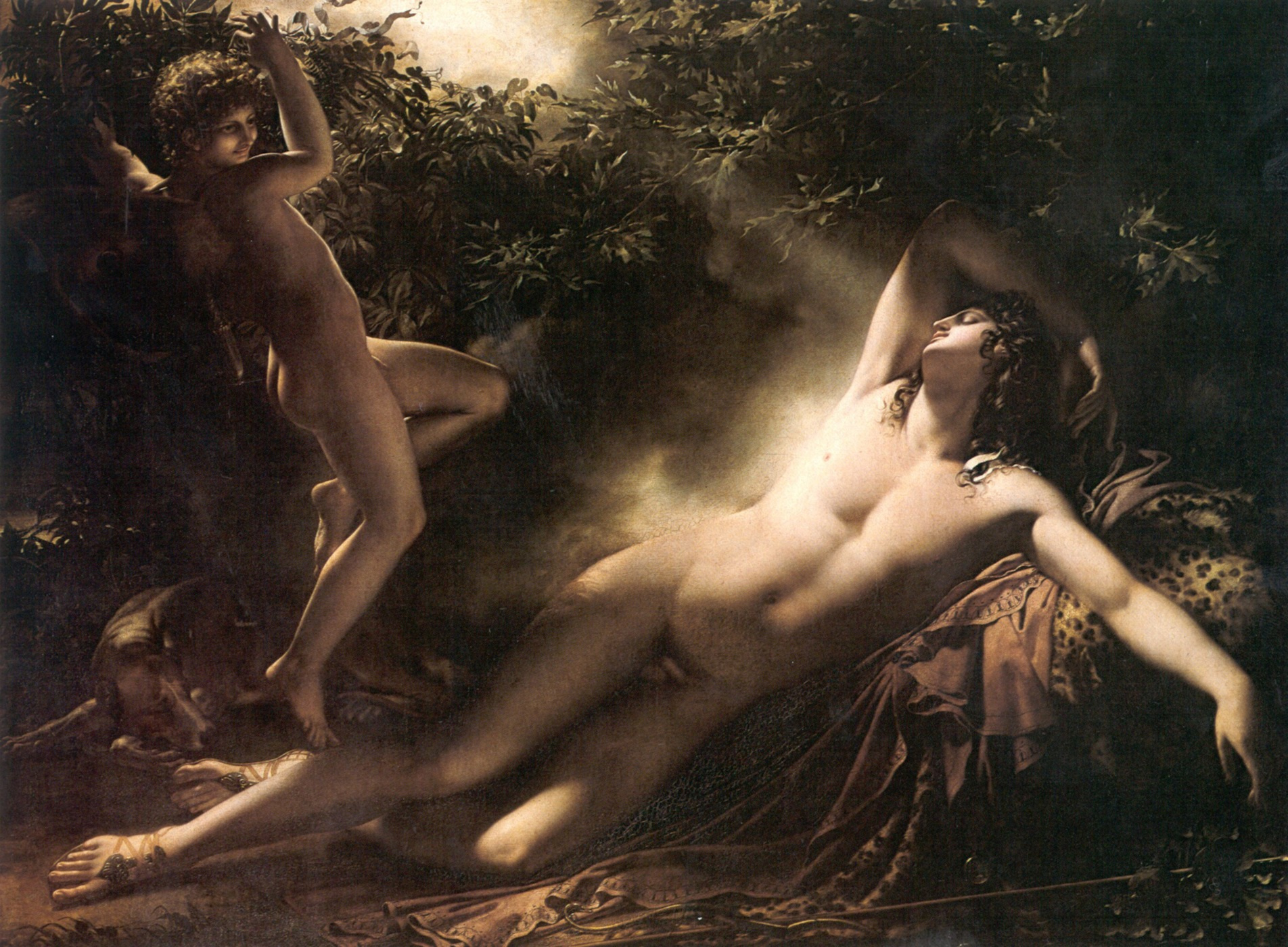
The Sleep of Endymion (Le Sommeil d'Endymion or Effet de lune), 1791, Louvre

Once he returned to France, Girodet painted many portraits, including some of members of the Bonaparte family. In 1806, in competition with the Sabines of David, he exhibited his Scène du déluge (Louvre), which was awarded the decennial prize. In 1808 he produced the Reddition de Vienne and Atala au tombeau, a work which won immense popularity, by its fortunate choice of subject – François-René de Chateaubriand's novel Atala, first published in 1801 – and its remarkable departure from the theatricality of Girodet's usual manner. He would return to his theatrical style in La Révolte du Caire (1810).

== Later life ==
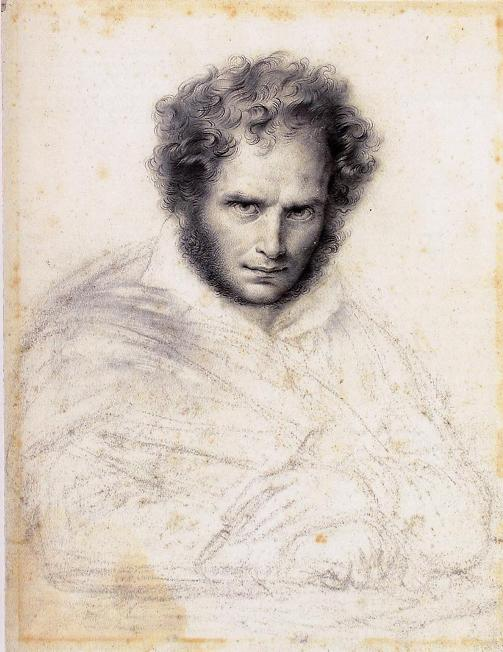
Self-portrait from 1824, Musée des Beaux-Arts d'Orléans

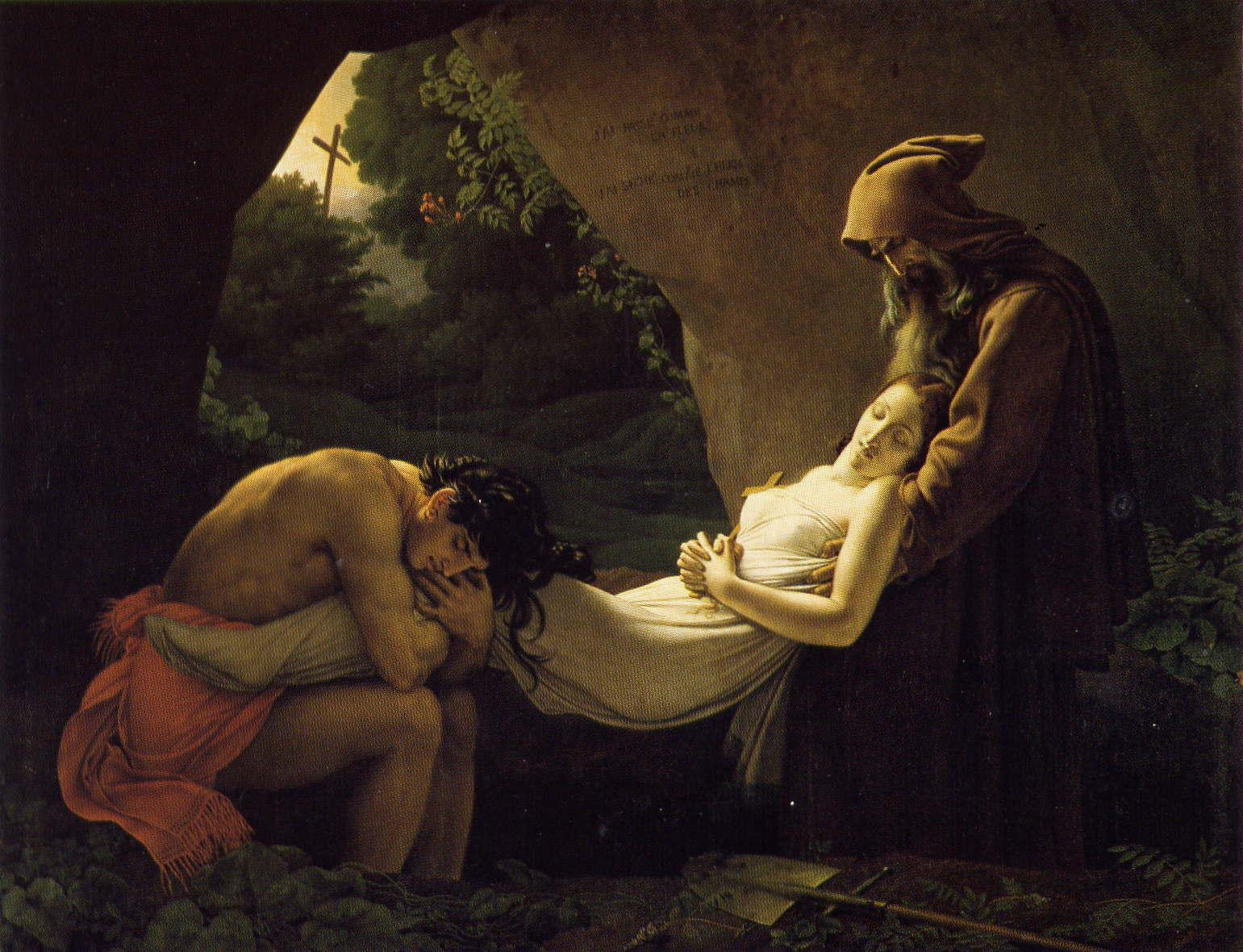
The Funeral of Atala (Funérailles d'Atala or Atala au tombeau), 1808, Louvre

Girodet was a member of the Academy of Painting and of the Institut de France, a knight of the Order of Saint Michael, and officer of the Legion of Honour. Among his pupils were Hyacinthe Aubry-Lecomte, Augustin Van den Berghe the Younger, François Edouard Bertin, Angélique Bouillet, Alexandre-Marie Colin, Marie Philippe Coupin de la Couperie, Henri Decaisne, Paul-Emile Destouches, Achille Devéria, Eugène Devéria, Savinien Edme Dubourjal, Joseph Ferdinand Lancrenon, Antonin Marie Moine, Jean Jacques François Monanteuil, Henry Bonaventure Monnier, Rosalie Renaudin, Johann Heinrich Richter, François Edme Ricois, Joseph Nicolas Robert-Fleury, and Philippe Jacques Van Brée.

In his forties his powers began to fail, and his habit of working at night and other excesses weakened his constitution. In the Salon of 1812 he exhibited only a Tête de Vierge; in 1819 Pygmalion et Galatée showed a further decline of strength. In 1824, the year in which he produced his portraits of Cathelineau and Bonchamps, Girodet died on December 9 in Paris. At a sale of his effects after his death, some of his drawings realised enormous prices.

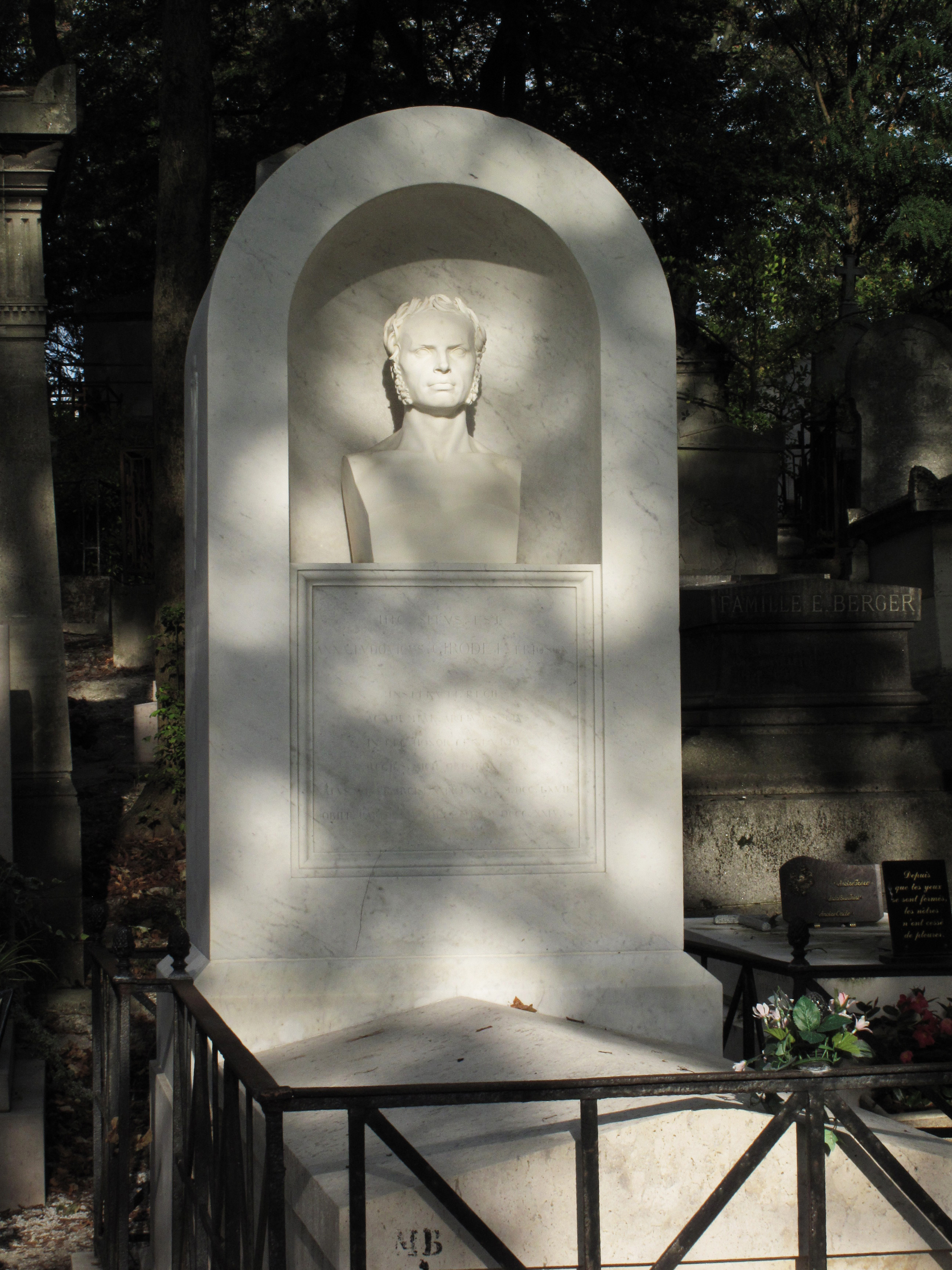
Tomb at Père Lachaise

== Posthumously published work ==
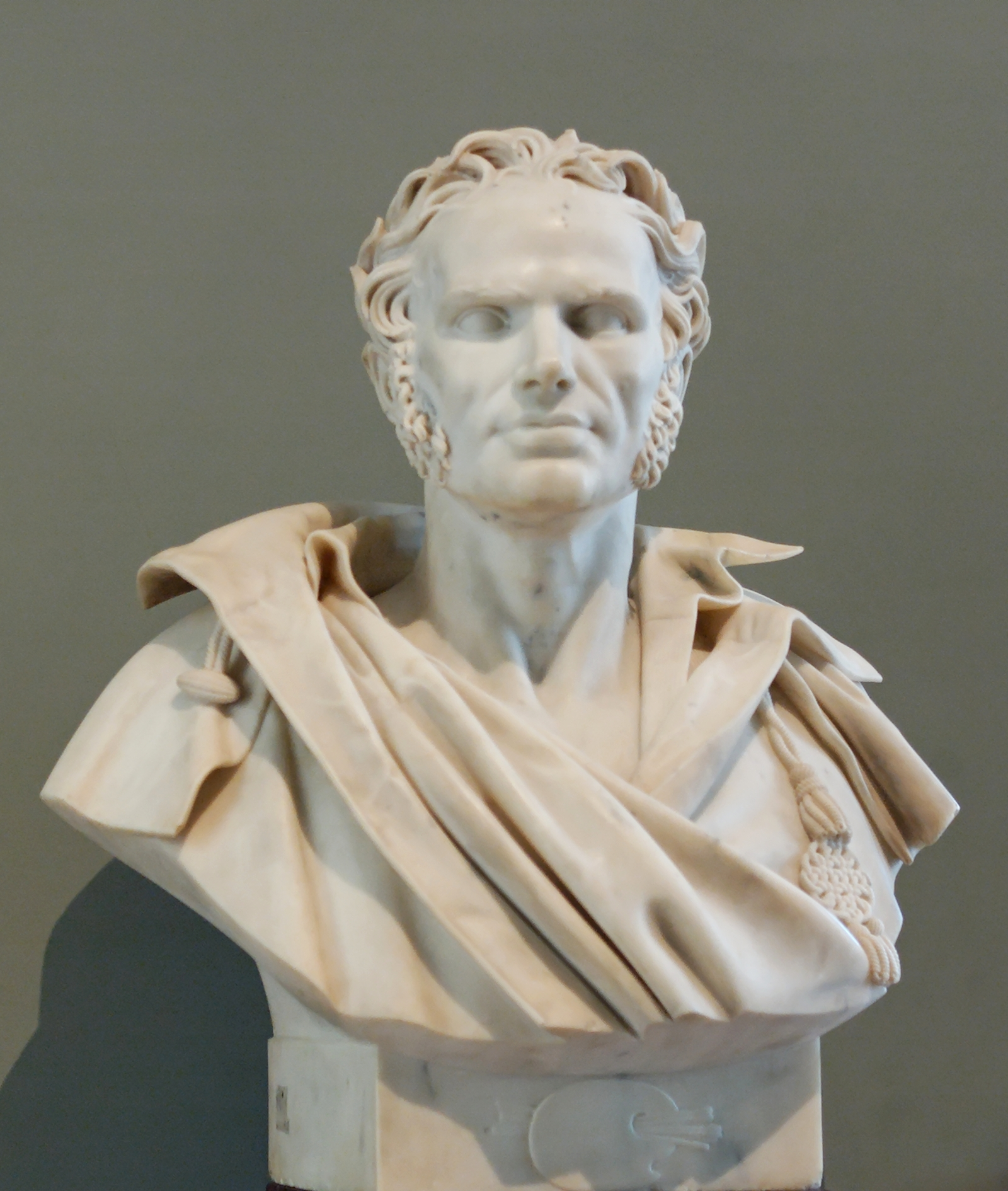
Bust of the painter (1827) by Jean-Baptiste Roman, Louvre

Girodet produced a vast quantity of illustrations, amongst which may be cited those for the Didot editions of the works of Virgil (1798) and Racine (1801–1805). Fifty-four of his designs for the works of the ancient Greek poet Anacreon were engraved by M. Châtillon. Girodet used much of his time on literary composition. His poem Le Peintre (rather a string of commonplaces), together with poor imitations of classical poets, and essays on Le Génie and La Grâce, were published posthumously in 1829, with a biographical notice by his friend Coupin de la Couperie. Delecluze, in his Louis David et son temps, has also a brief life of Girodet.

Girodet: Romantic Rebel was the first retrospective in the United States devoted to the works of Anne-Louis Girodet de Roussy-Trioson; the exhibition was initiated by the Cleveland Museum of Art and organised by the Musée du Louvre and the Réunion des Musées Nationaux, Paris, in collaboration with the Art Institute of Chicago, the Metropolitan Museum of Art, New York, and the Montreal Museum of Fine Arts, in cooperation with the Musée Girodet, Montargis. The exhibition assembled more than 100 seminal works (about 60 paintings and 40 drawings) that demonstrated the artist's range as a painter as well as a draftsman. The exhibit was shown at the Art Institute of Chicago (11 February–30 April 2006), Musée du Louvre (22 September 2005–2 January 2006), the Metropolitan Museum of Art (24 May–27 August 2006) and the Montreal Museum of Fine Arts (12 October 2006–21 January 2007).

== Analysis of the works ==
Girodet was trained in the neoclassical style of his teacher, Jacques-Louis David, seen in his treatment of the male nude body and his reference to models from the Renaissance and Classical antiquity. However, he also deviated from this style in several ways. The peculiarities which mark Girodet's position as the herald of the romantic movement are already evident in his Sleep of Endymion (1791, also called Effet de lune or "effect of the Moon"). Although the subject matter and pose are inspired by classical precedents, Girodet's diffuse lighting is more theatrical and atmospheric. The androgynous depiction of the sleeping shepherd Endymion is also noteworthy. These early romantic effects were even more notable in his Ossian, exhibited in 1802. Girodet portrayed recently killed Napoleonic soldiers being welcomed into Valhalla by the fictional bard Ossian. The painting is striking for its inclusion of phosphorescent meteors, vaporous luminosity, and spectral protagonists.

The same coupling of classic and romantic elements marks Girodet's Danae (1799) and his Quatre Saisons, executed for the king of Spain (repeated for Compiègne), and shows itself to in his Fingal (Leuchtenberg collection, St. Petersburg), executed for Napoleon in 1802. Girodet can be seen here combining aspects of his classical training and traditional education with new literary trends, popular scientific spectacles, and a consummate interest in the strange and the bizarre. In this way his work announces the rise of a romantic aesthetic which prizes individuality, expression, and imagination over an adherence to classical academic precedents.

== Gallery ==
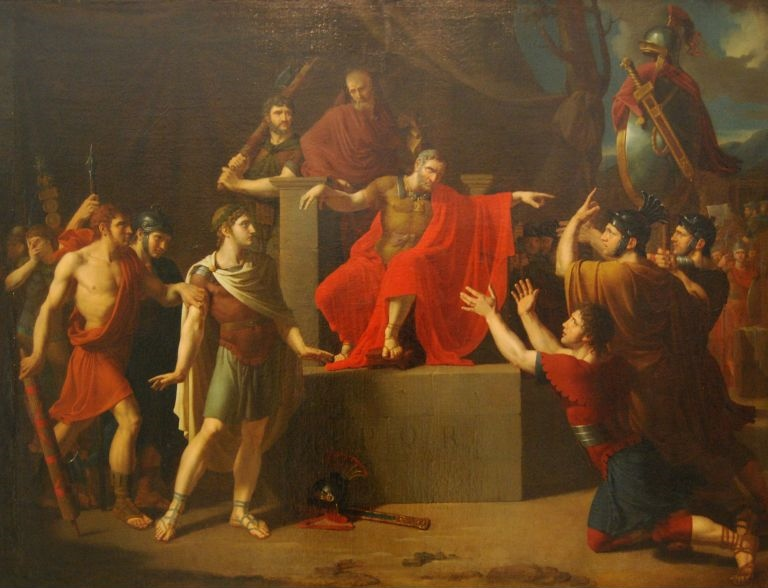
Brutus condemns his sons to death (Brutus condamne ses fils à mort), 1785

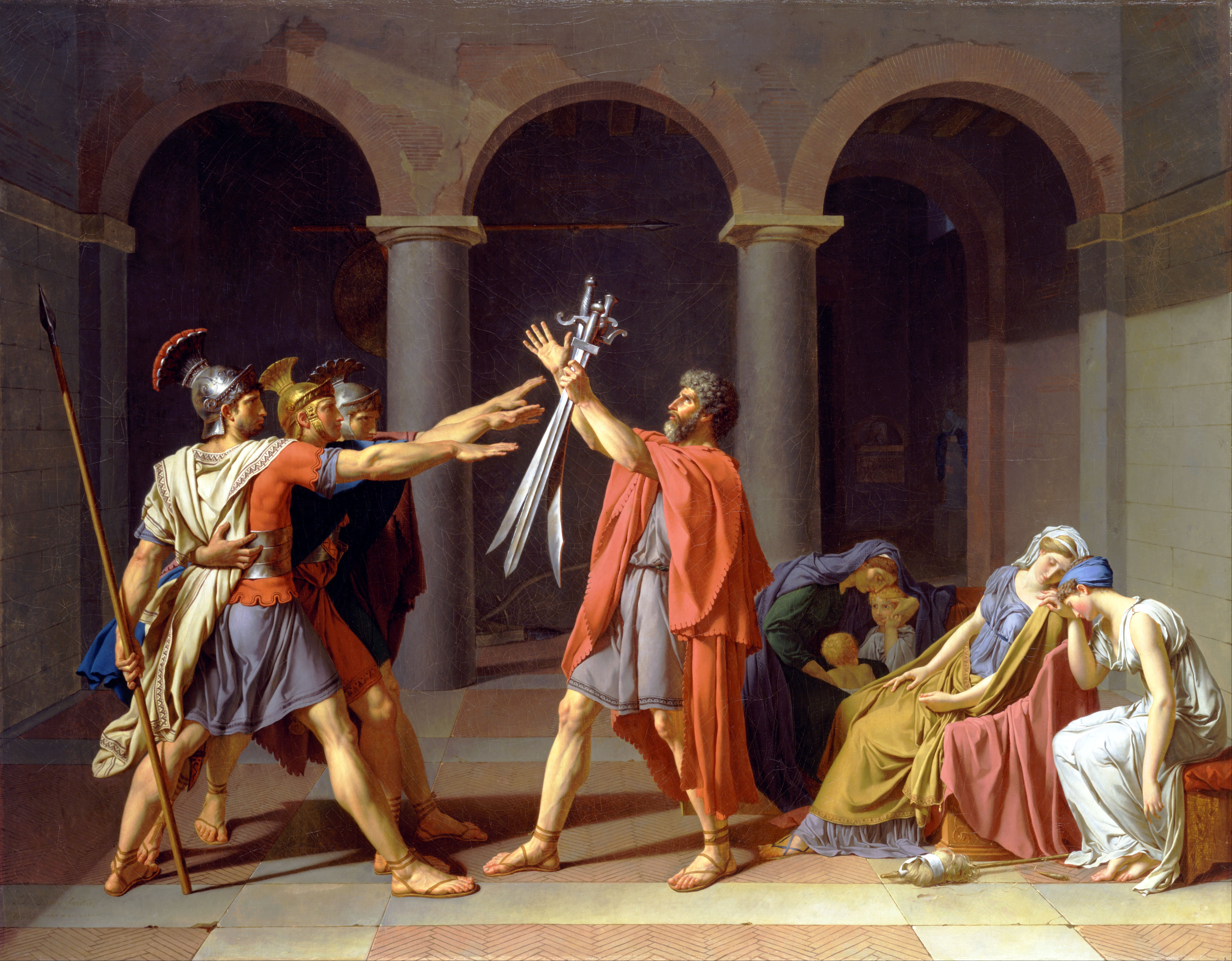
The Oath of the Horatii (Le Serment des Horaces, copy after David's original), 1786, Toledo Museum of Art, Ohio

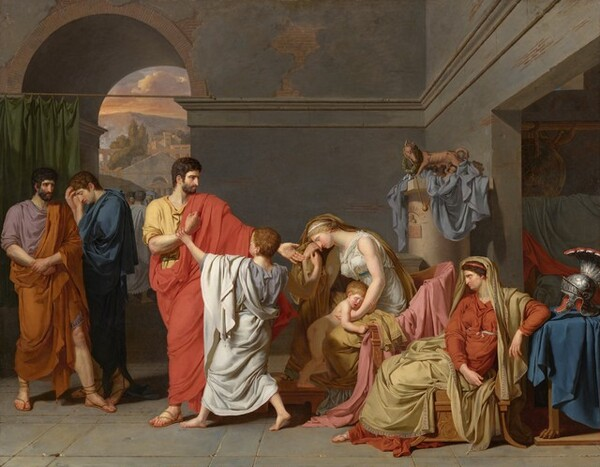
Coriolanus Taking Leave of His Family, 1786

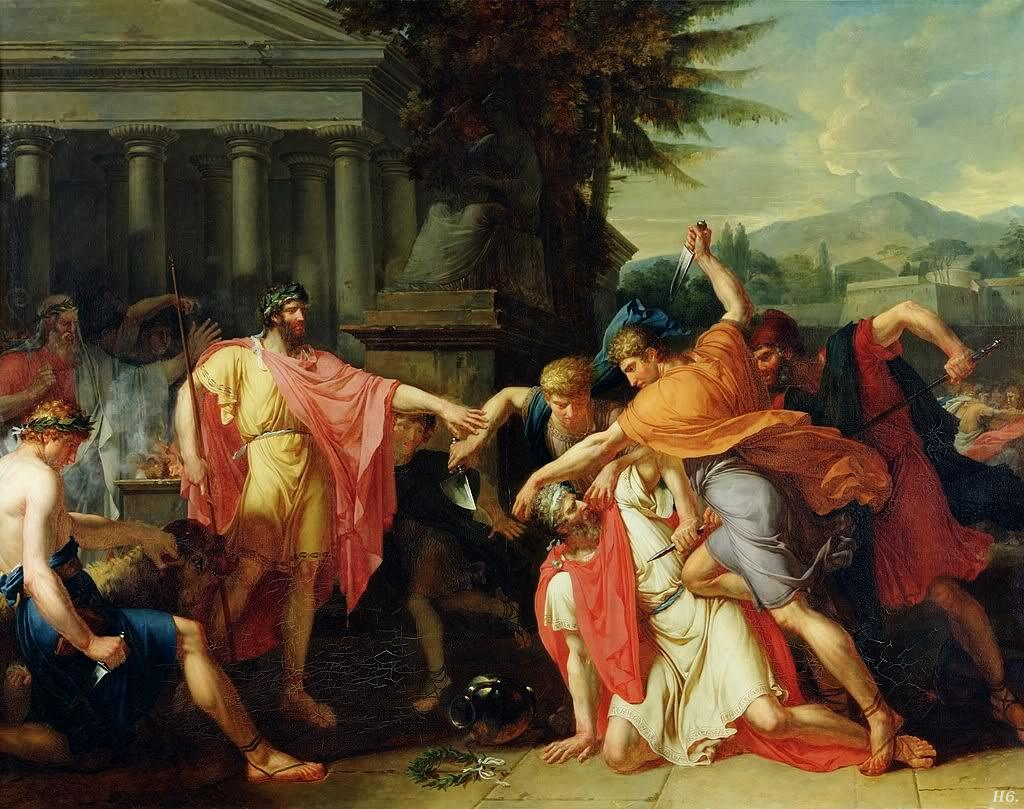
The Death of Tatius (La mort de Tatius), 1788, Musée des Beaux-Arts d'Angers

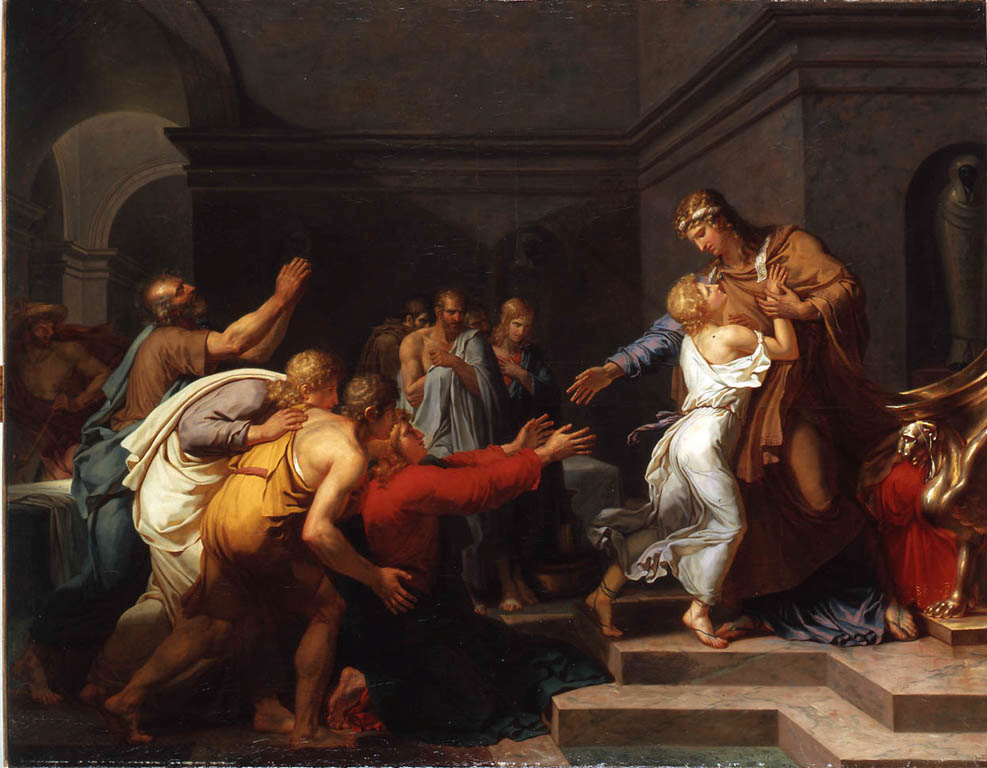
Joseph Recognised by His Brothers, 1789, École nationale supérieure des Beaux-Arts, Paris

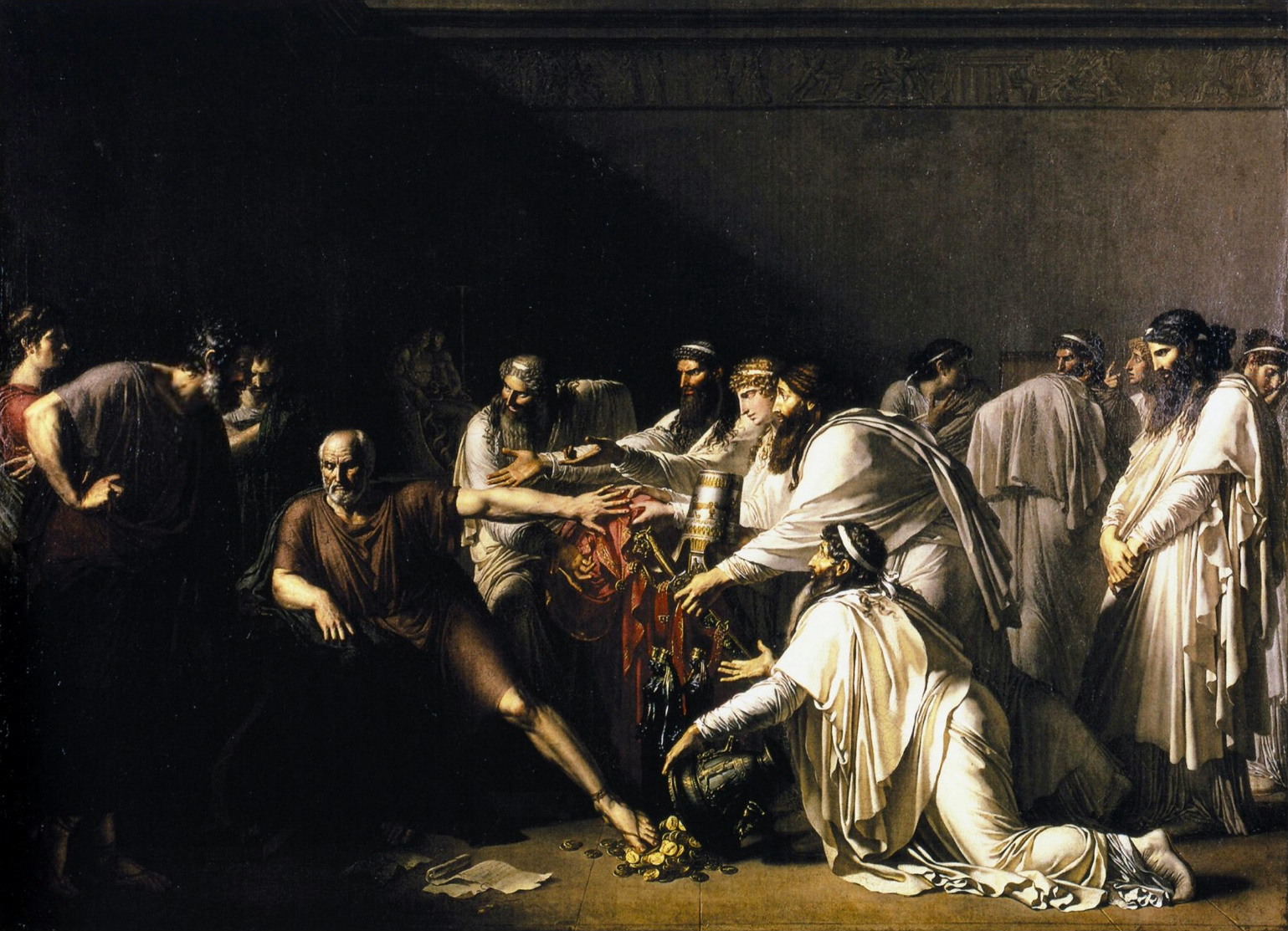
Hippocrates Refusing the Gifts of Artaxerxes, 1792, Museum of the History of Medicine

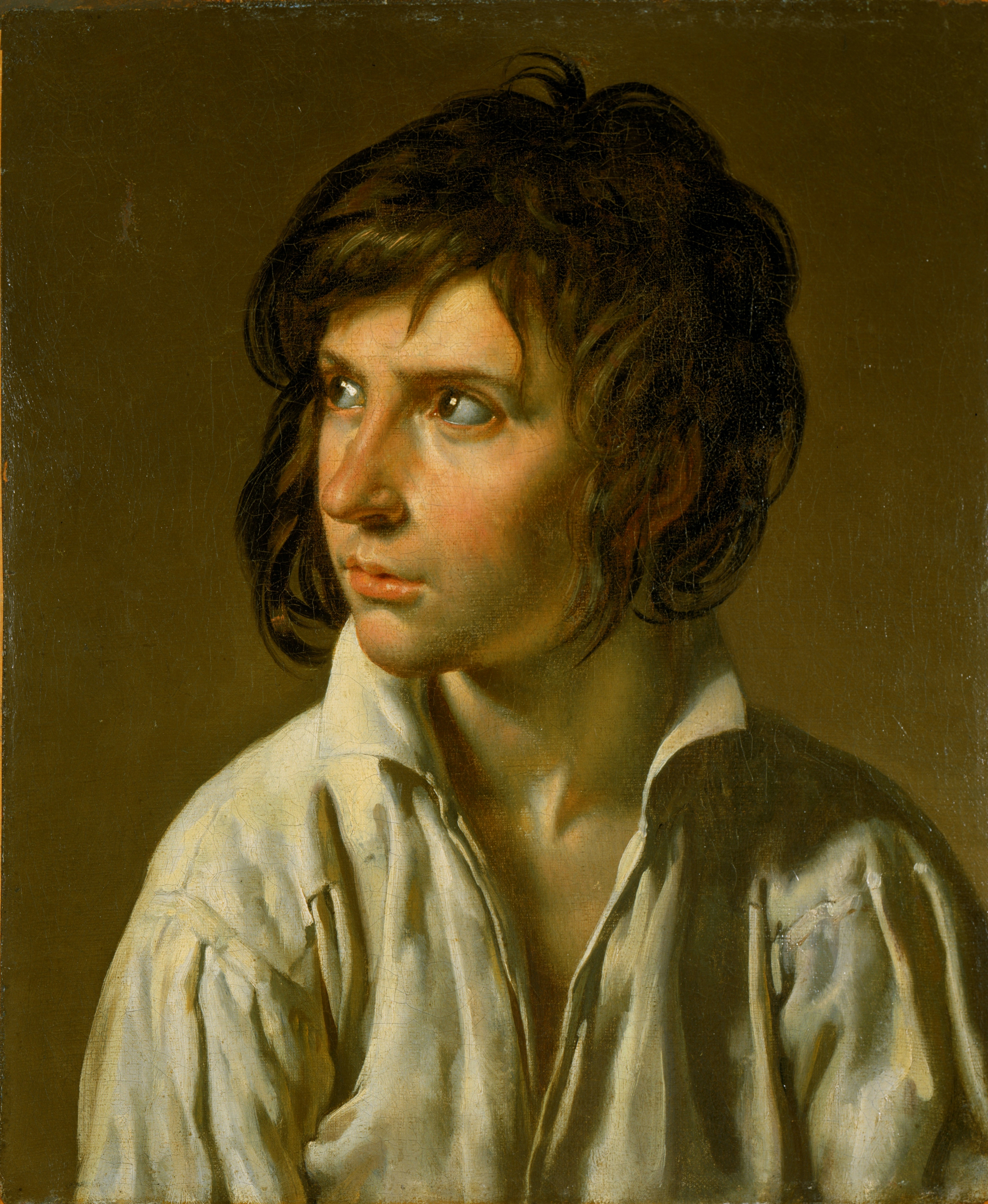
Portrait of a Youth (Portrait d'une jeunesse), c. 1795, Smith College Museum of Art, Northampton, Massachusetts

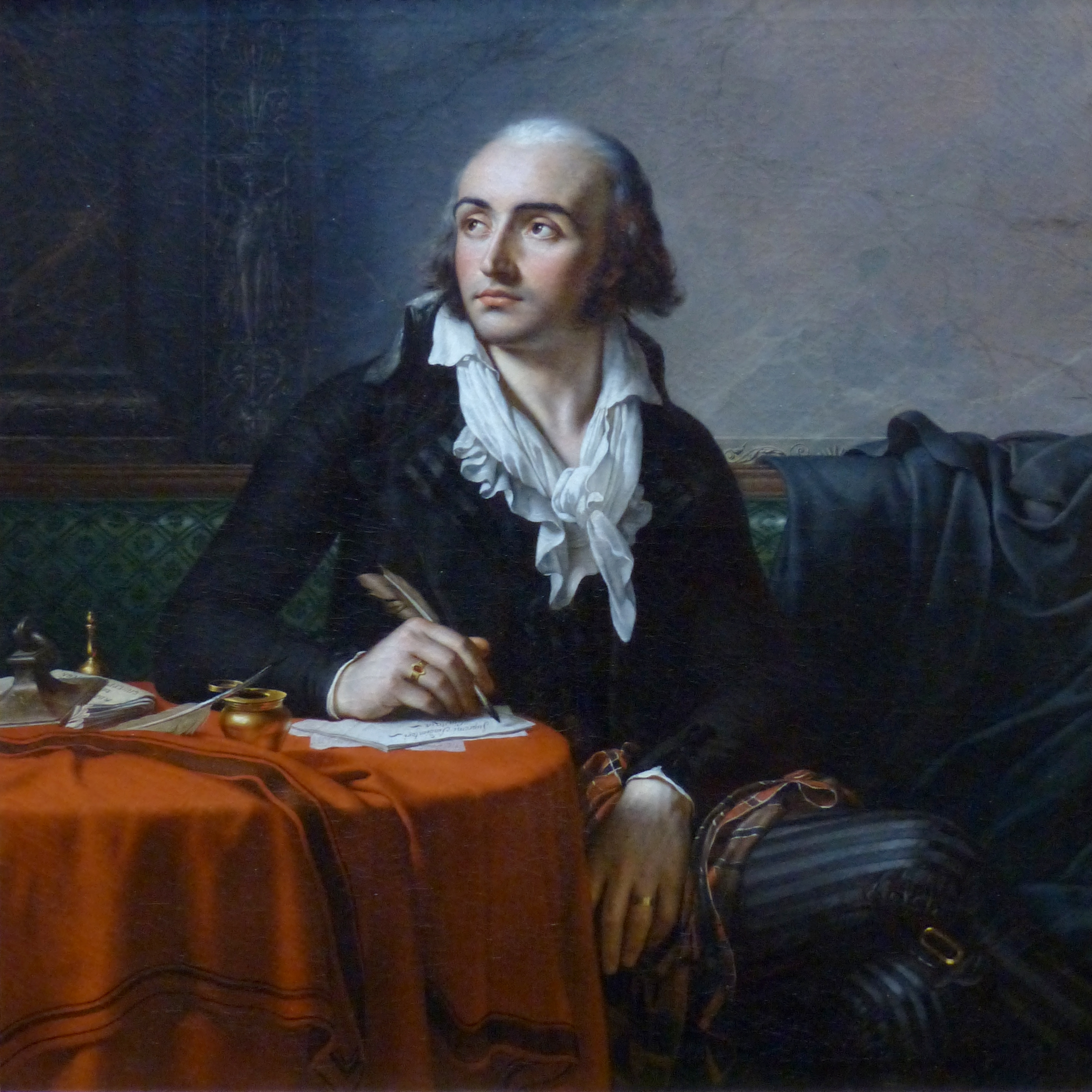
Portrait of Giuseppe Fravega (ministre of the Ligurian Republic in Paris), 1796, Musée des beaux-arts de Marseille

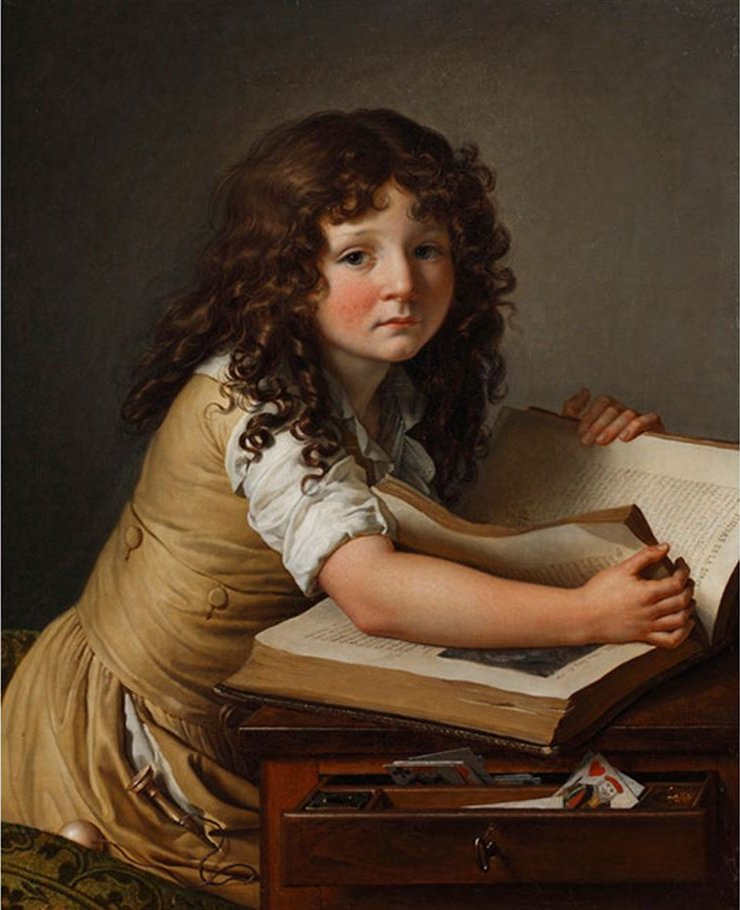
Benoît-Agnès Trioson regardant des figures dans un livre, 1797, Musée Girodet, Montargis

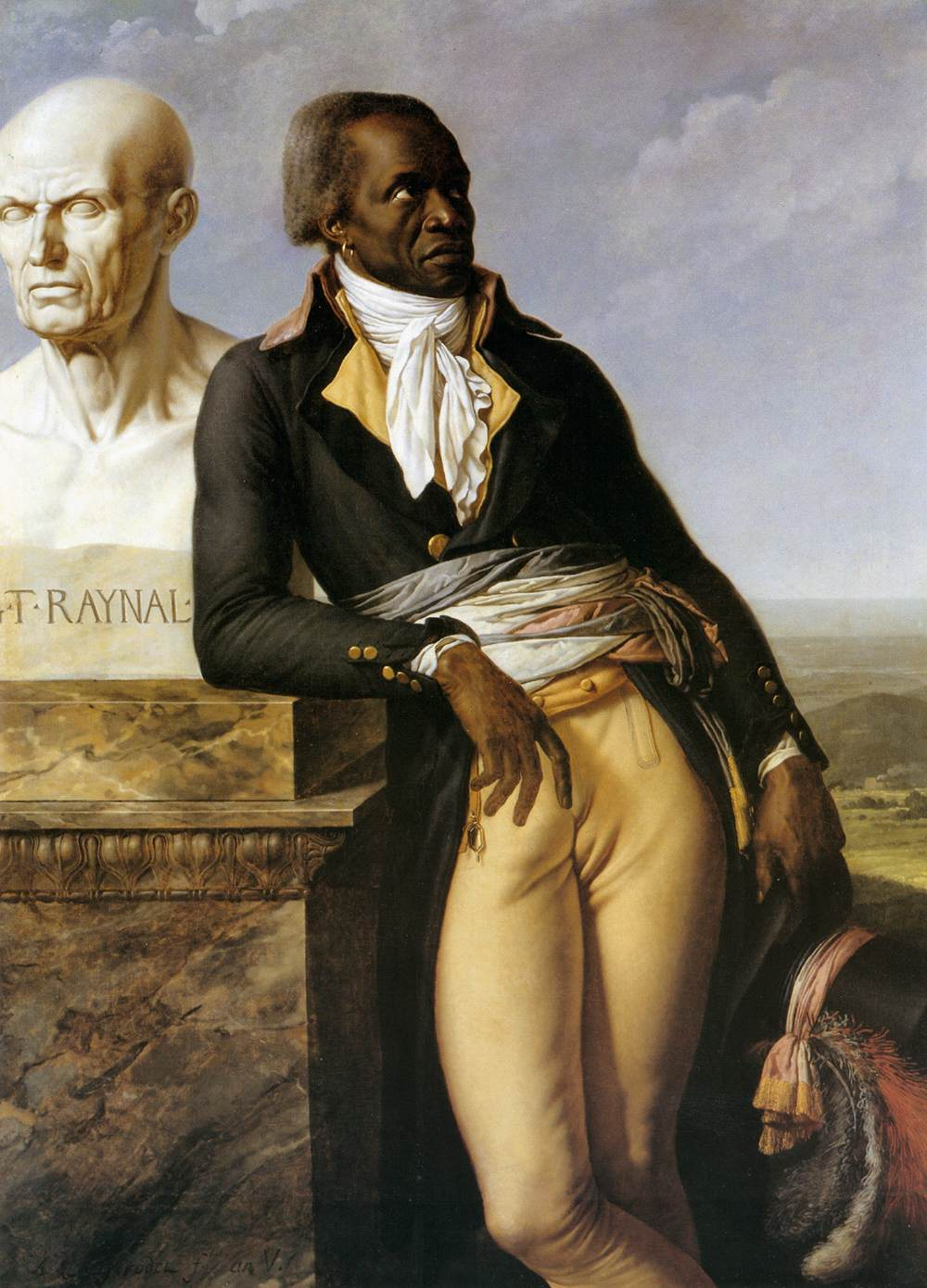
Portrait of Jean-Baptiste Belley, 1797, Palace of Versailles

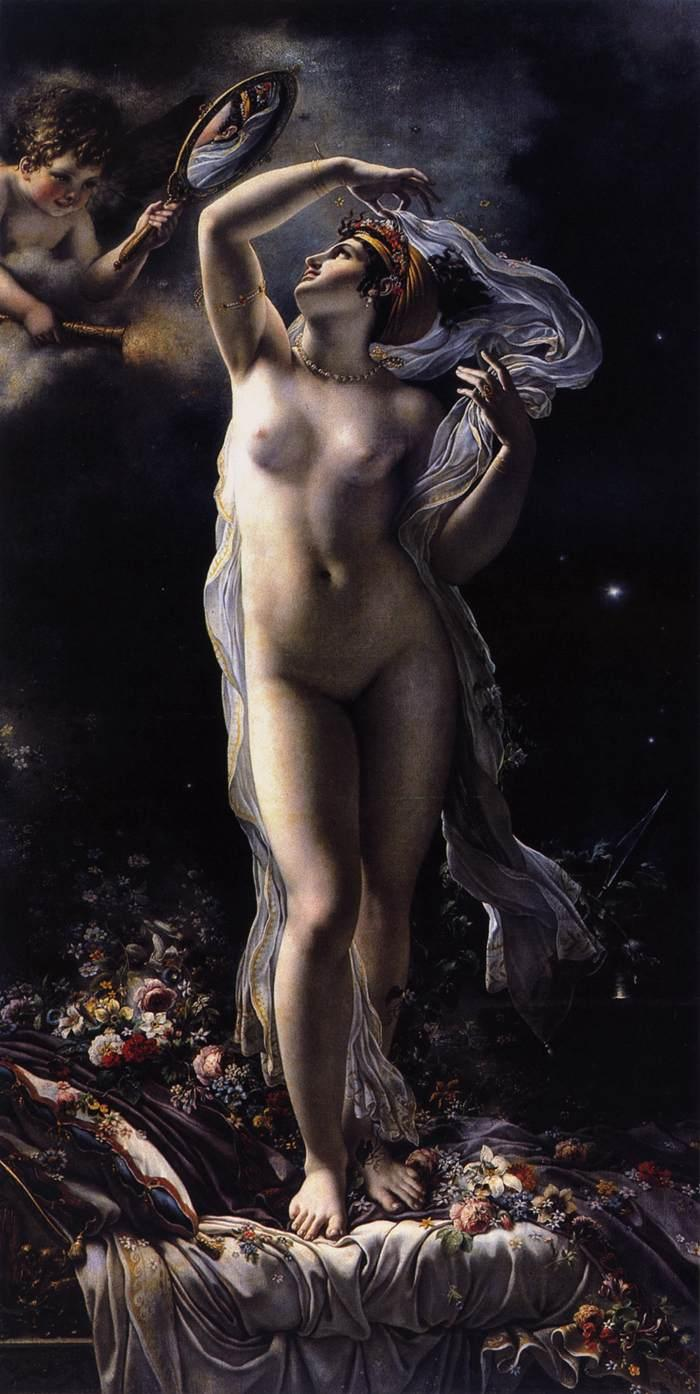
Danaé,1798, Museum der bildenden Künste, Leipzig

Portrait of Mlle. Lange as Danae, 1799, Minneapolis Institute of Arts, Minnesota

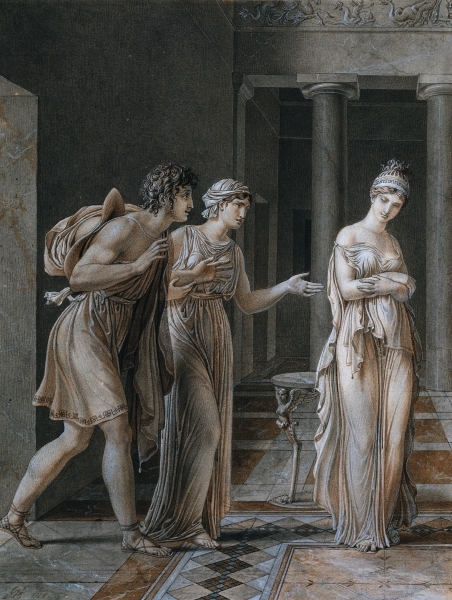
The Meeting of Orestes and Hermione, c. 1800

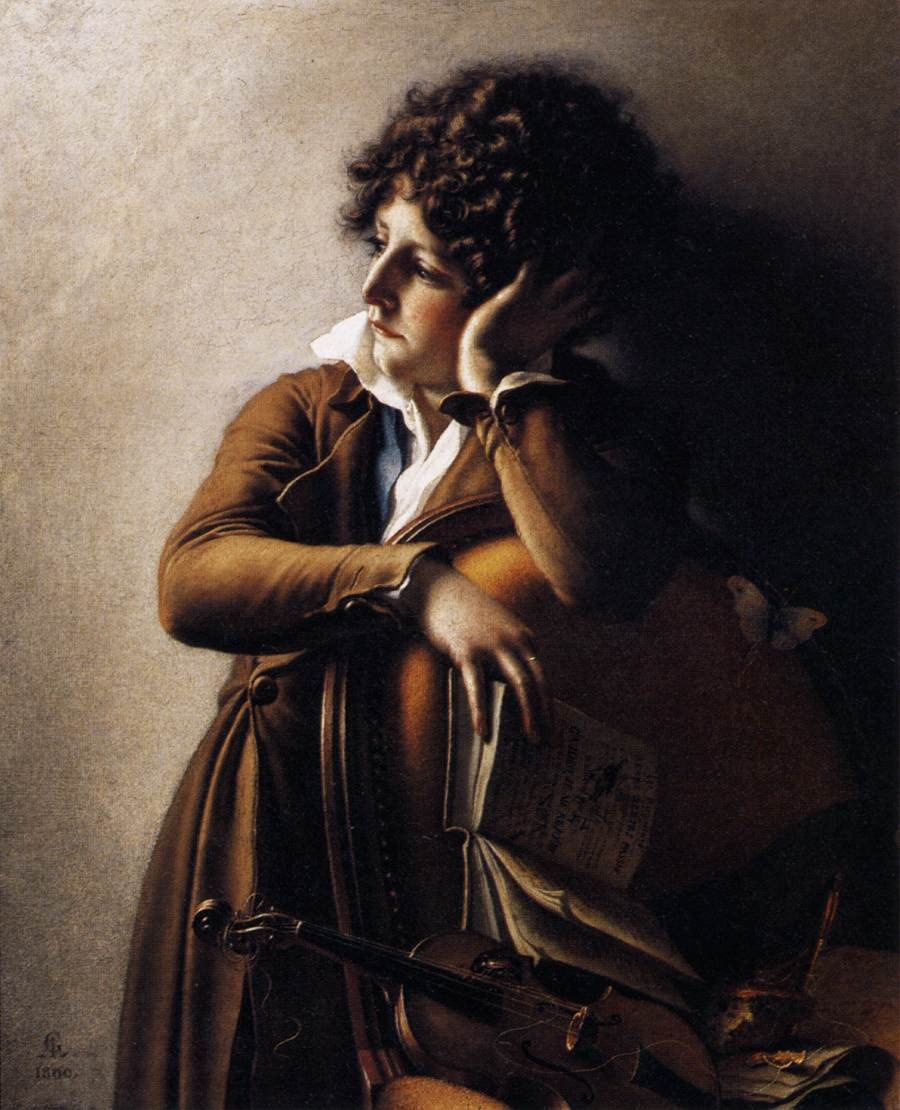
Benoît-Agnes Trioson, 1800, Louvre, Paris

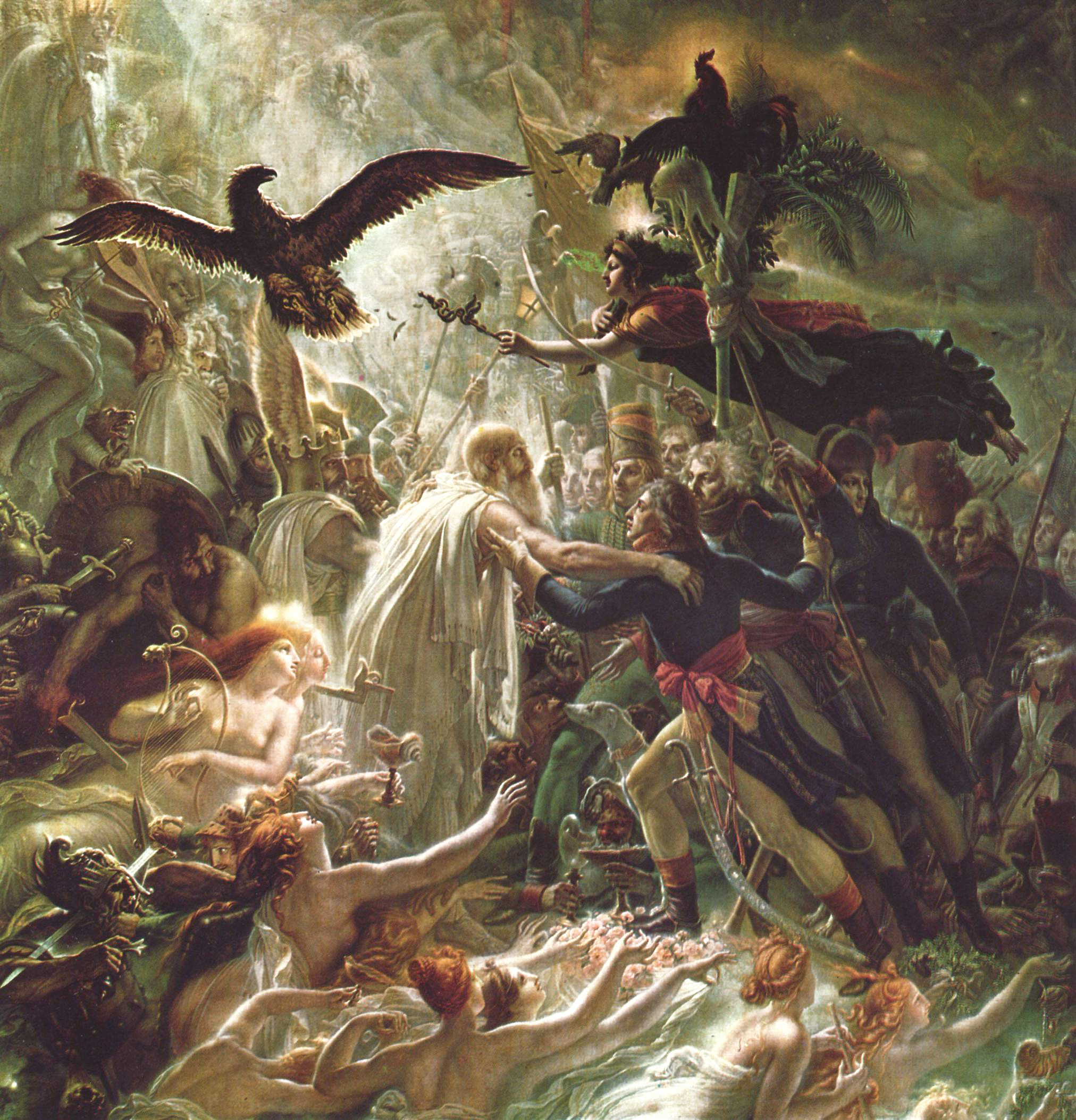
Ossian receiving the Ghosts of the French Heroes, c. 1801, Château de Malmaison

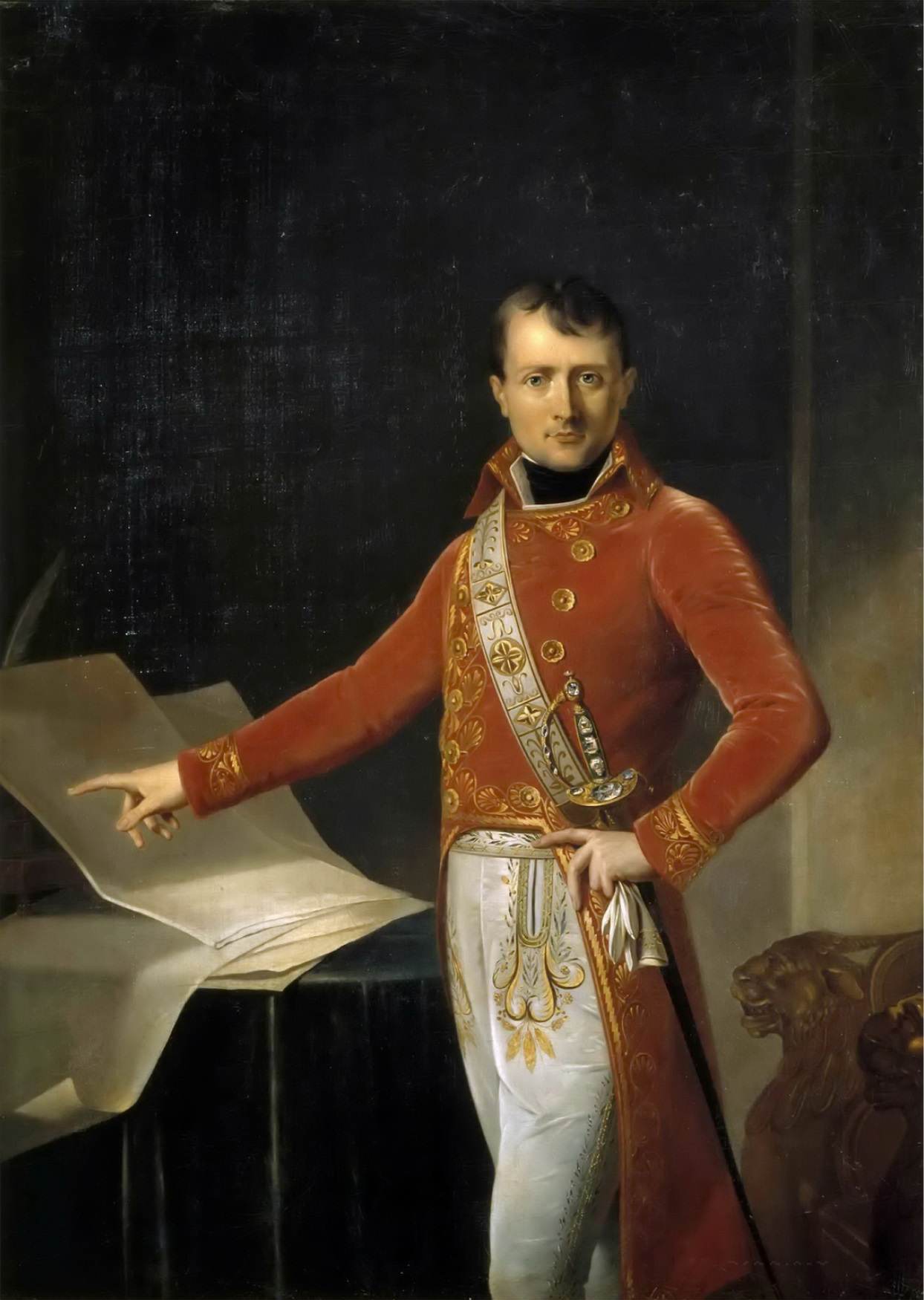
Napoleon Bonaparte, Premier Consul, Palais de l'Elysée

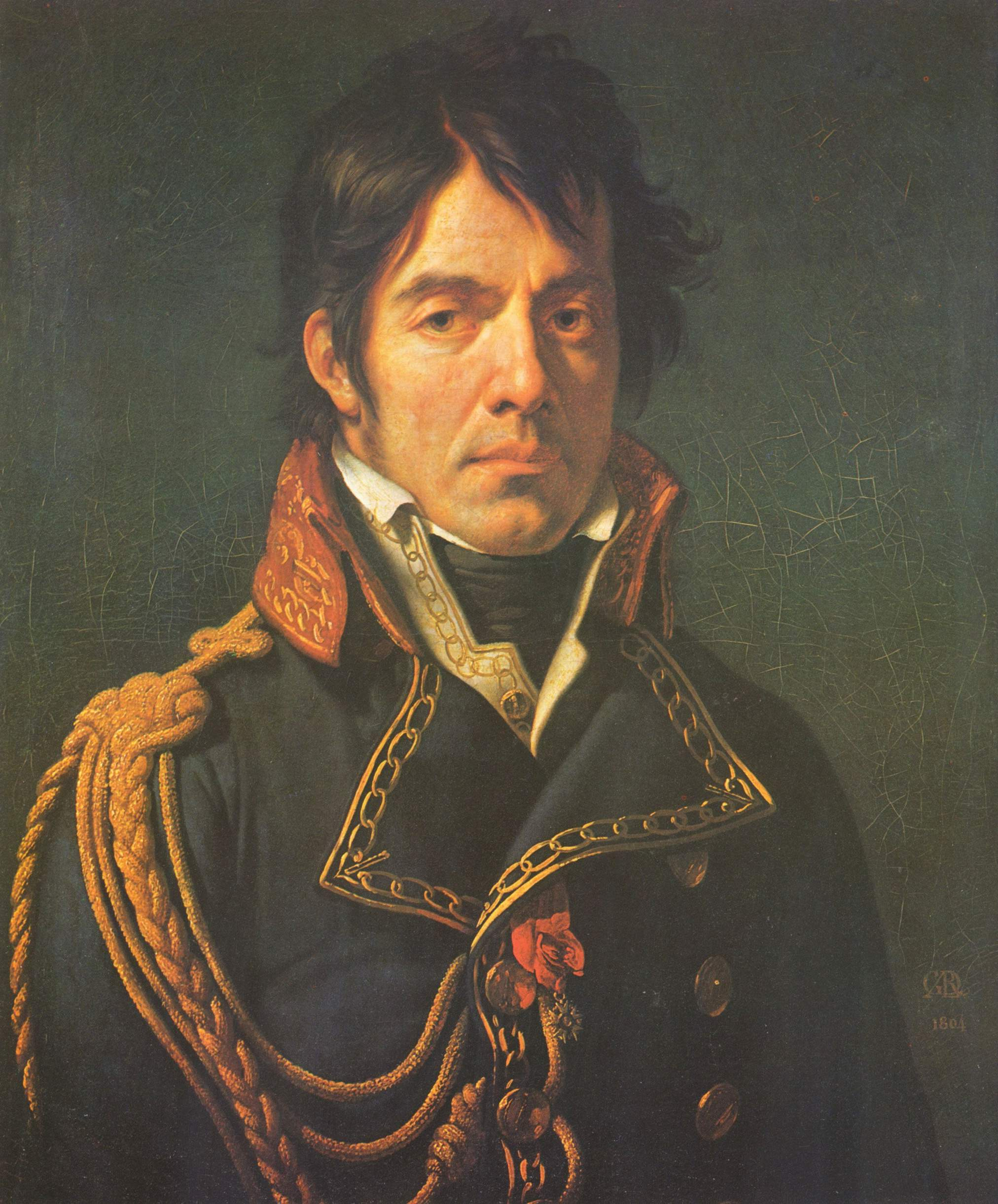
Portrait of Dominique-Jean Larrey (military surgeon in Napoleon's army), 1804, Louvre

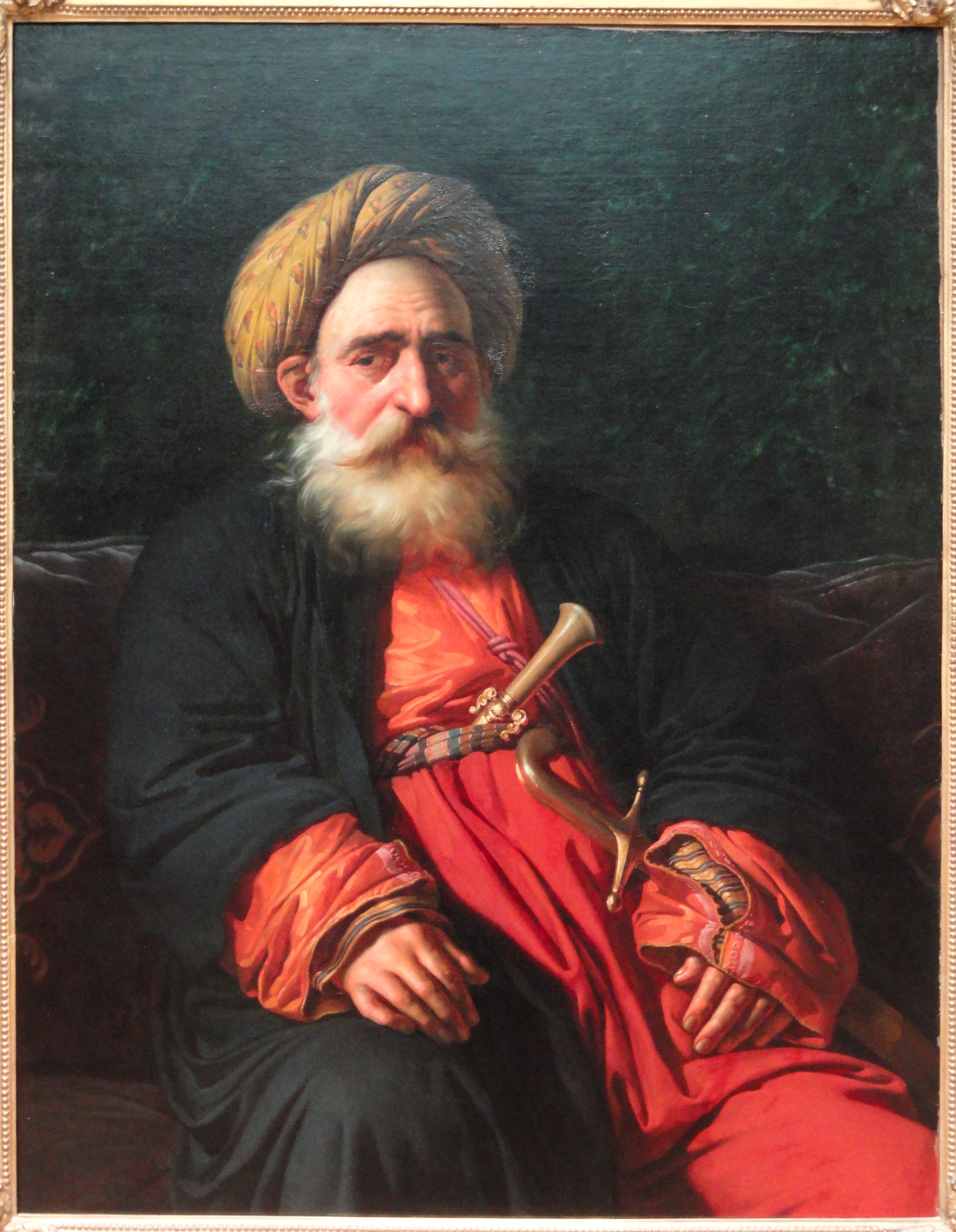
Portrait of the Katchef Dahouth, Christian Mameluke, 1804, Art Institute of Chicago

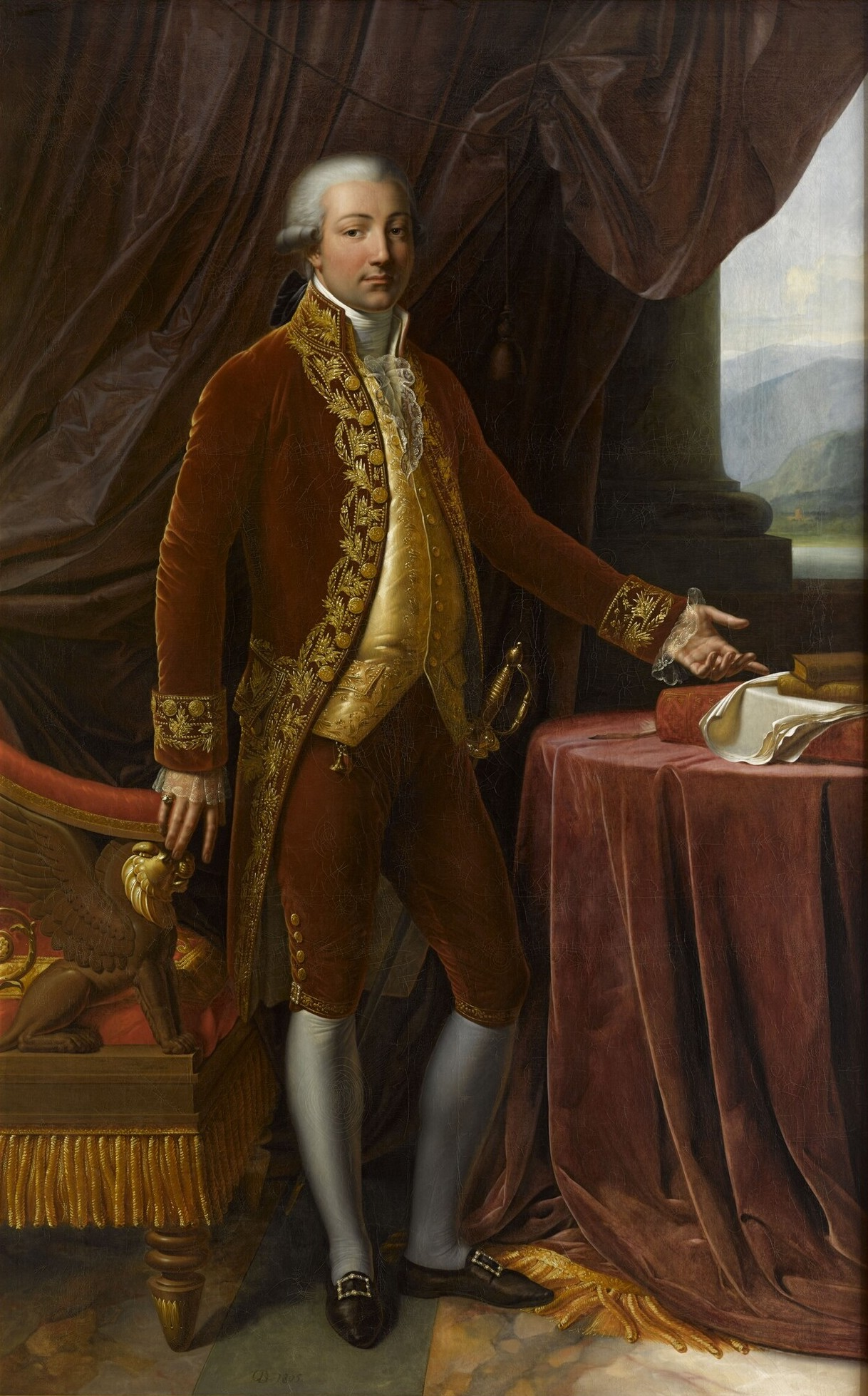
Charles Marie Bonaparte
(father of Napoléon Bonaparte), 1806

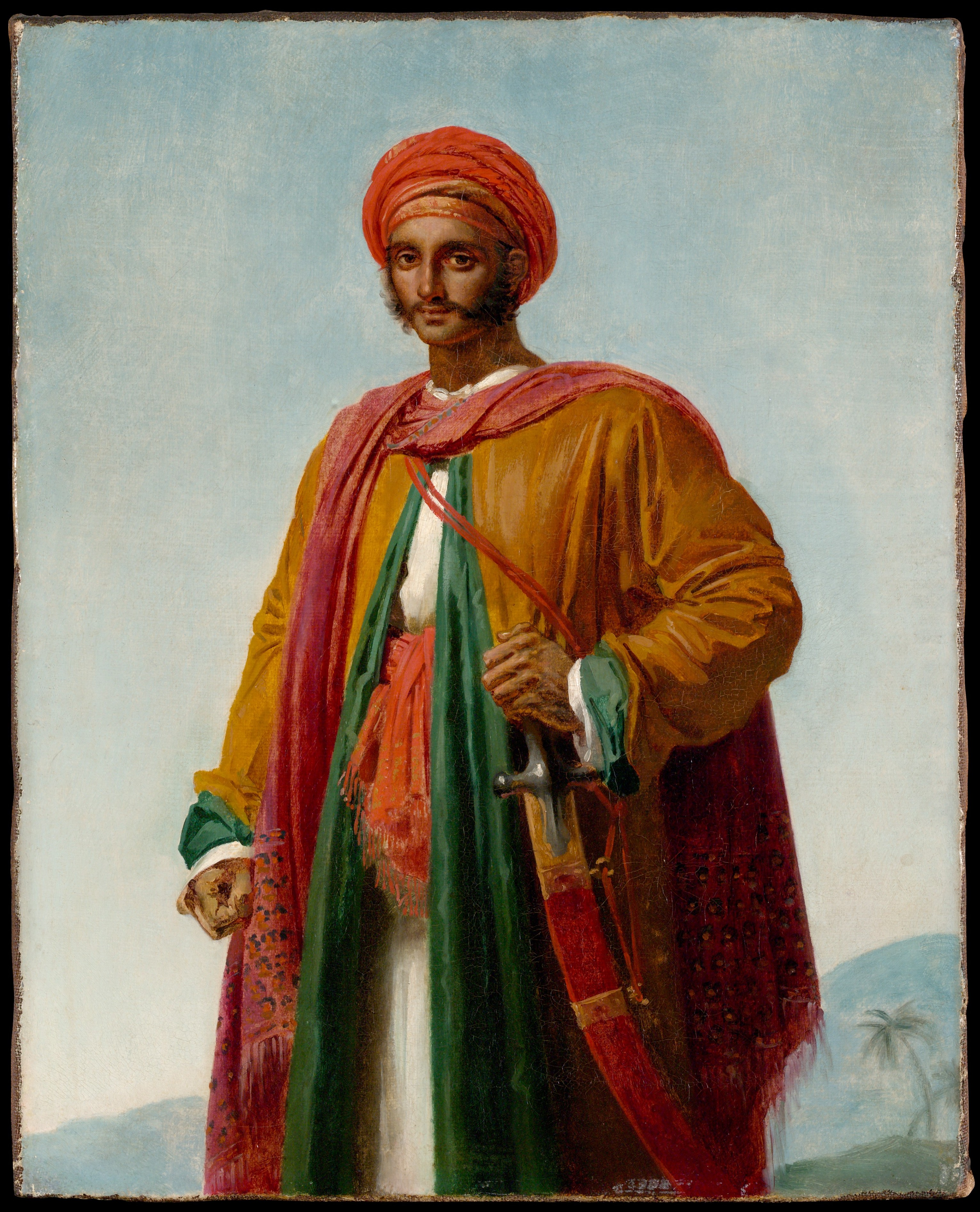
Study for Portrait of an Indian, c. 1807, Metropolitan Museum of Art, New York

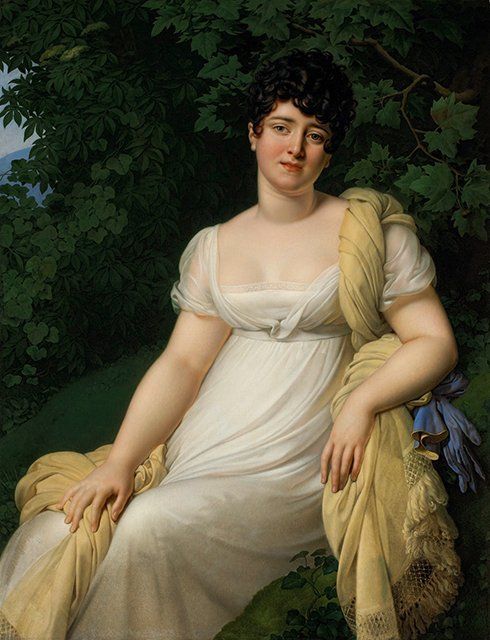
Madame Erneste Bioche de Misery, 1807, National Gallery of Canada, Ottawa

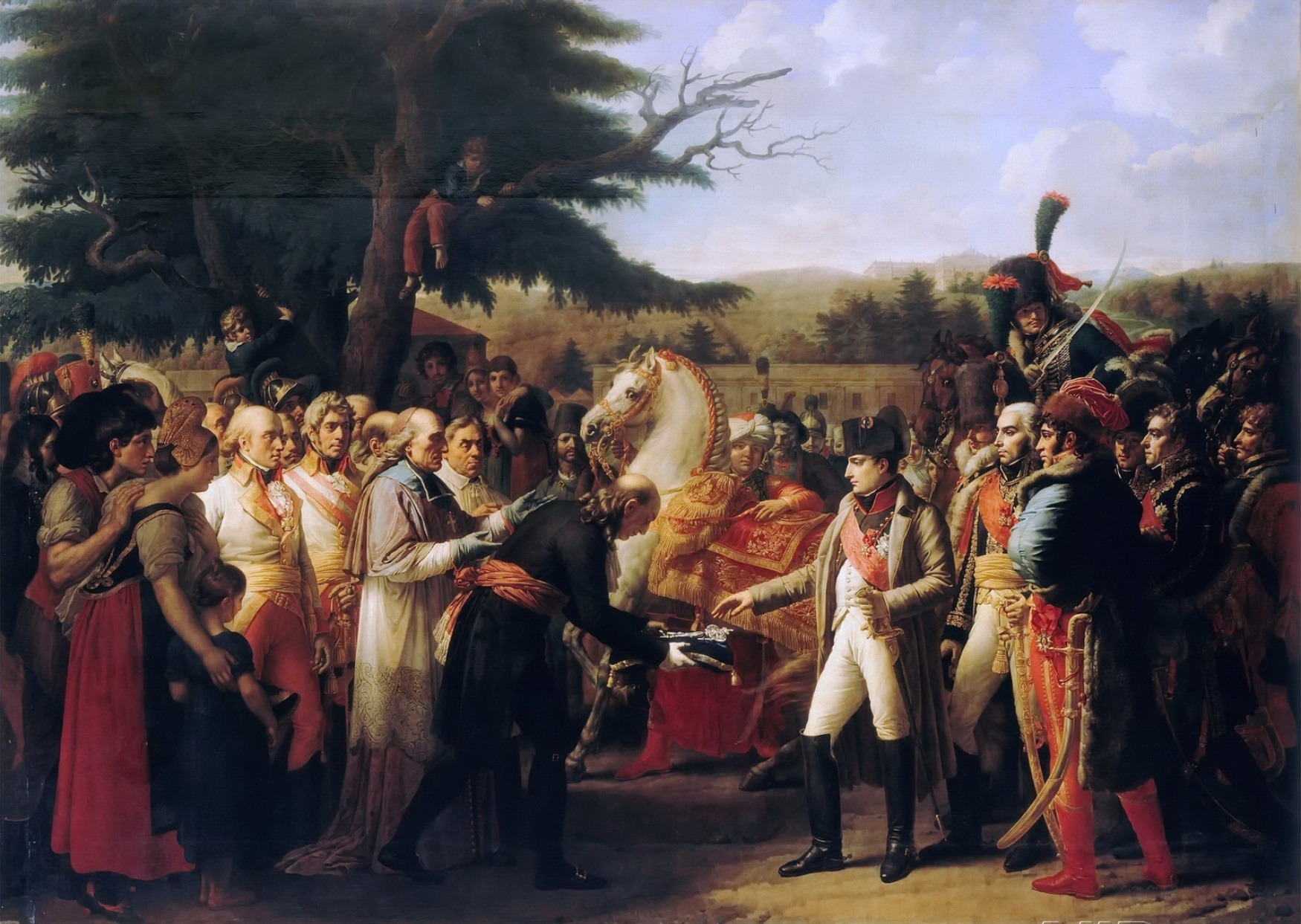
Napoleon Receiving the Keys of Vienna, 1808

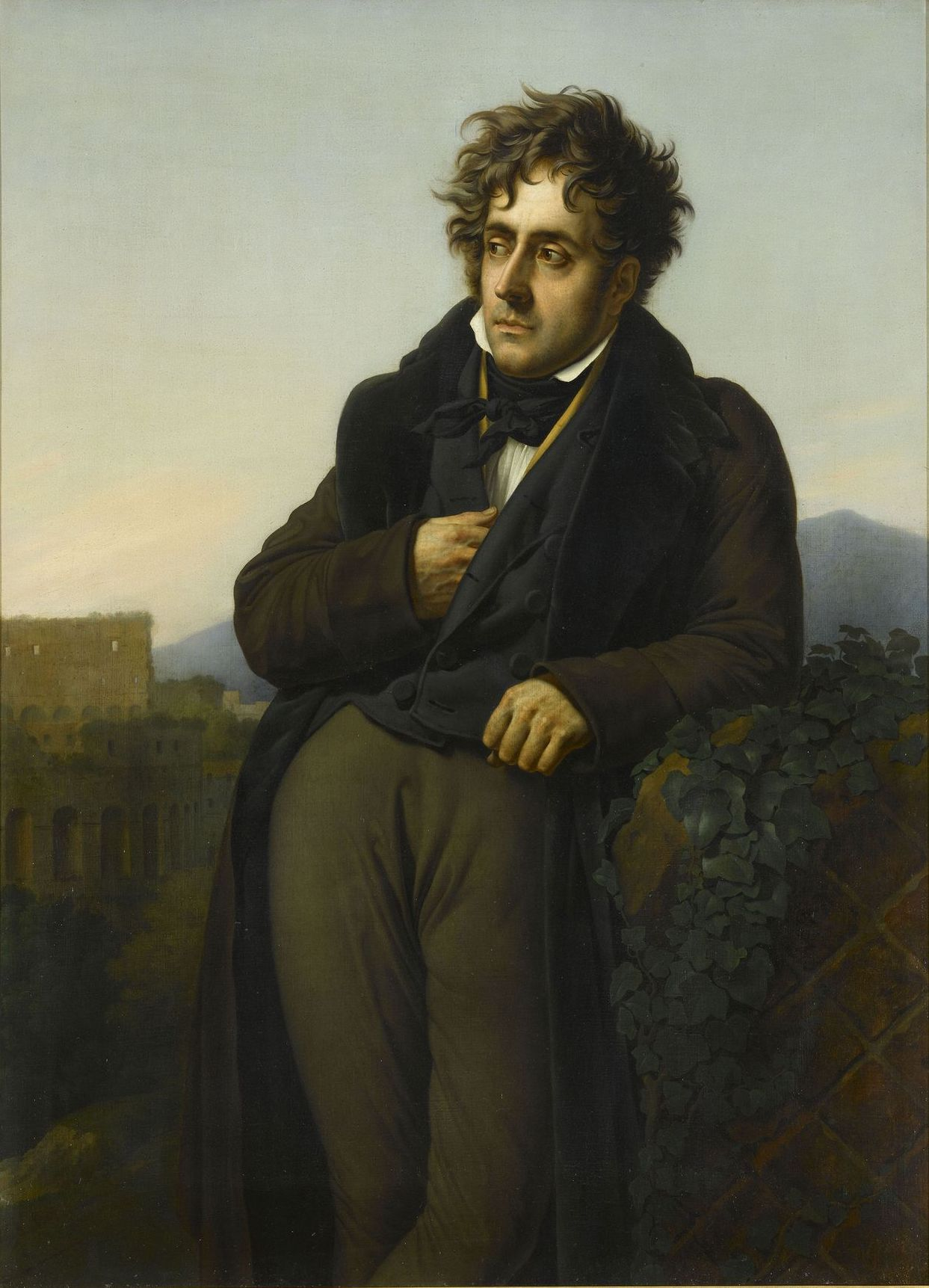
Portrait of Chateaubriand, 1809, Musée d'Histoire de la Ville et du Pays Malouin, Saint-Malo

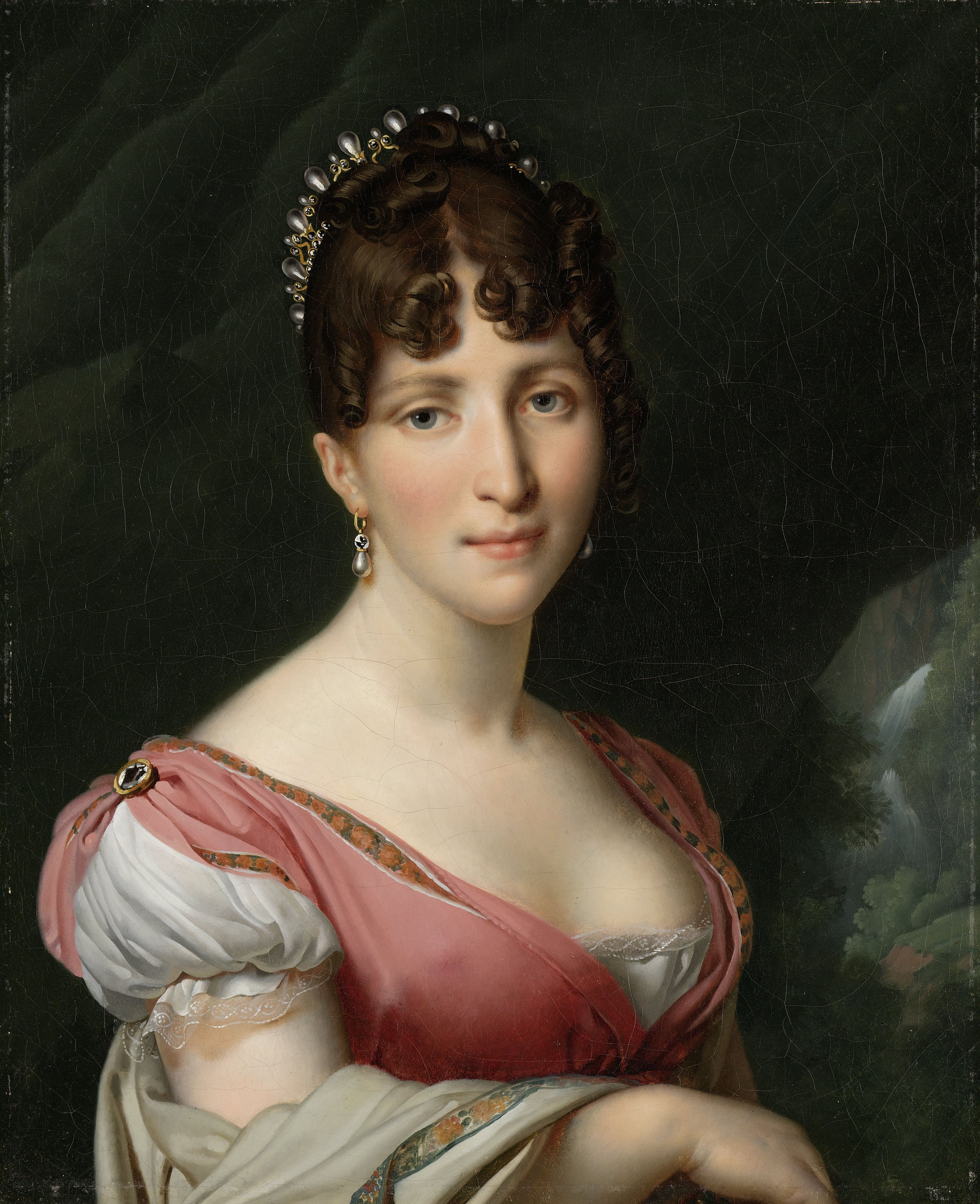
Portrait of Hortense de Beauharnais, Queen of Holland, wife of King Louis Napoleon, c. 1809, Rijksmuseum, Amsterdam

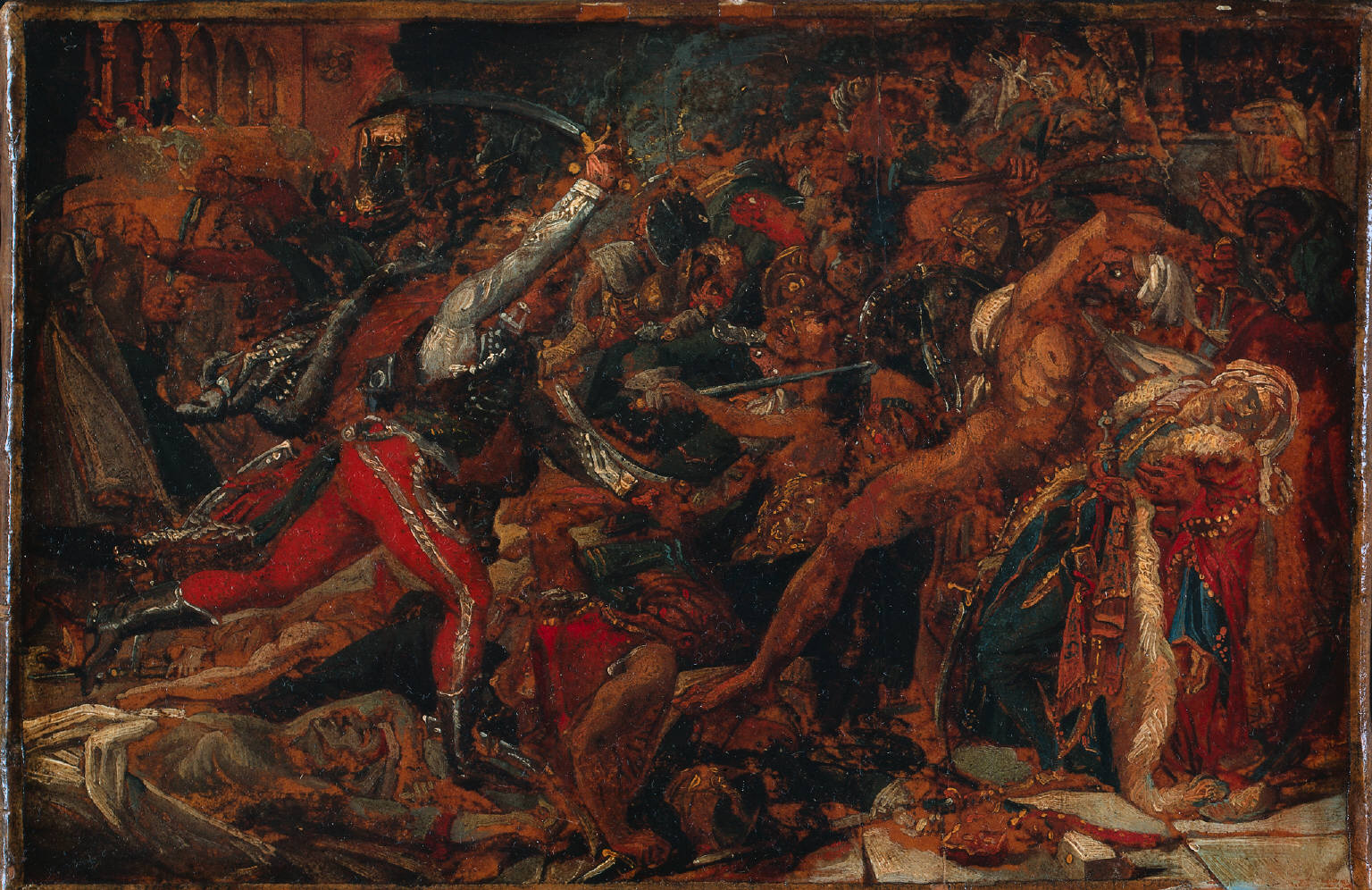
Sketch for The Revolt of Cairo, c. 1809, Cleveland Museum of Art

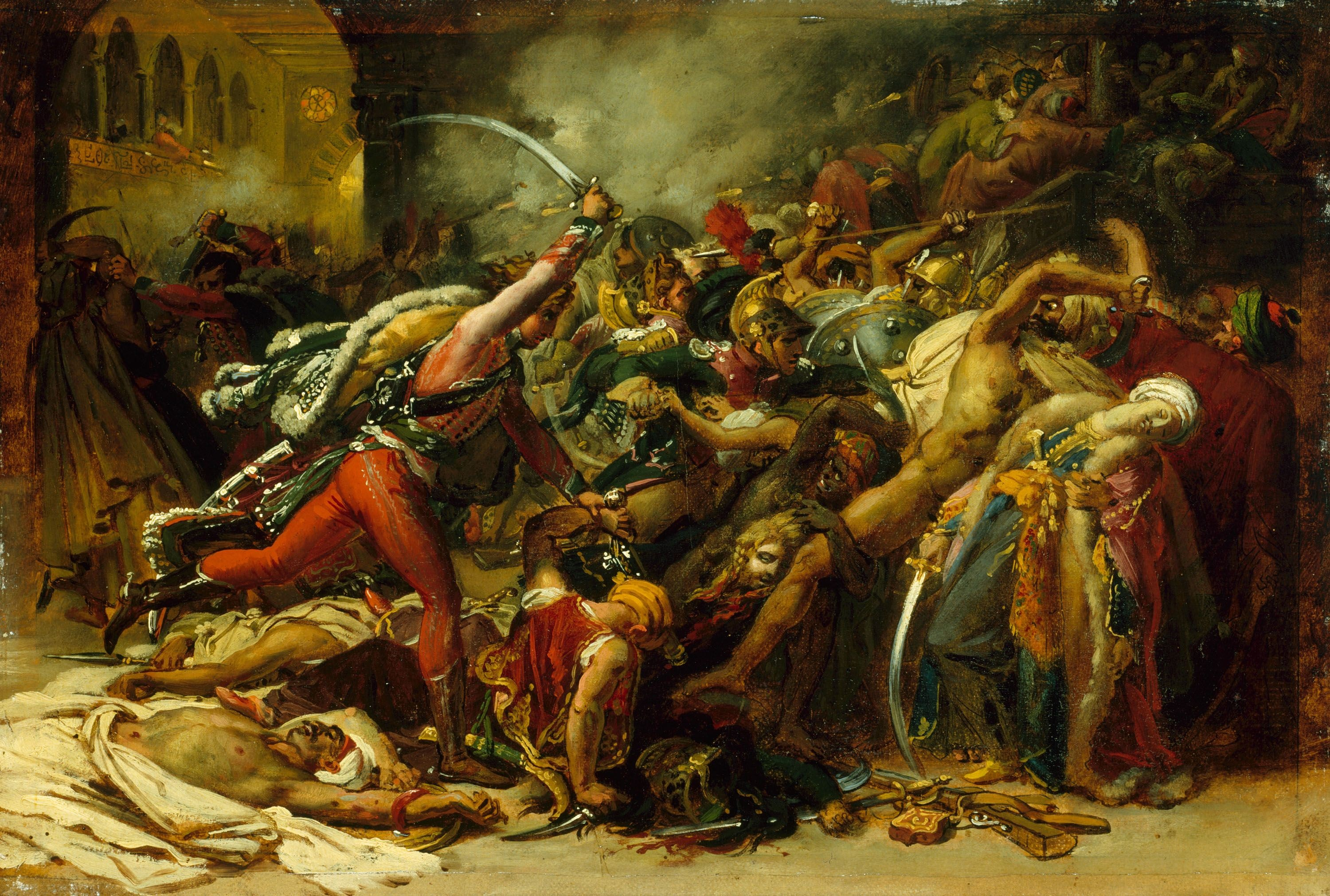
The Revolt of Cairo, oil and Indian ink on paper, c. 1810, Art Institute of Chicago

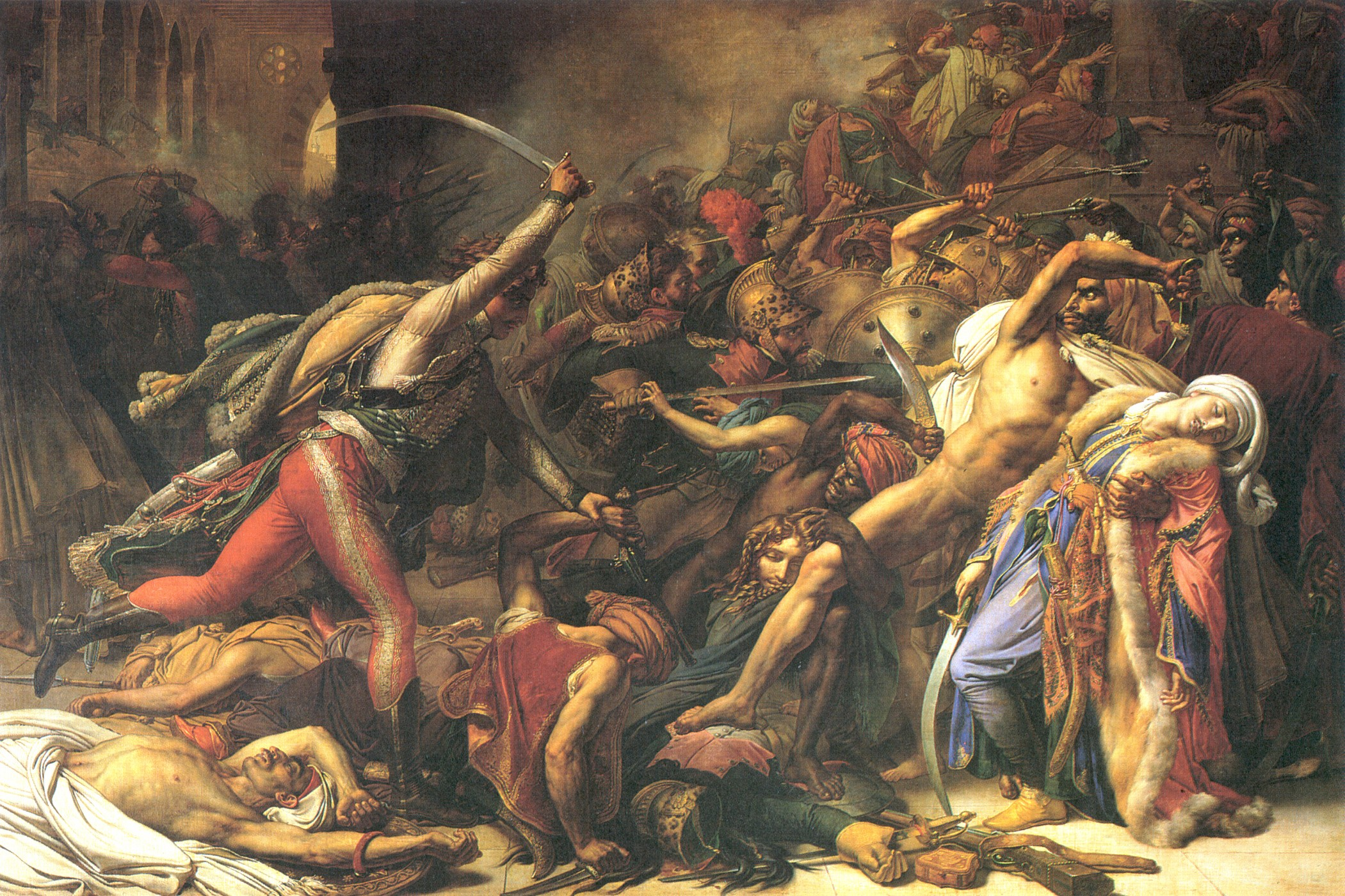
The Revolt of Cairo, 1810

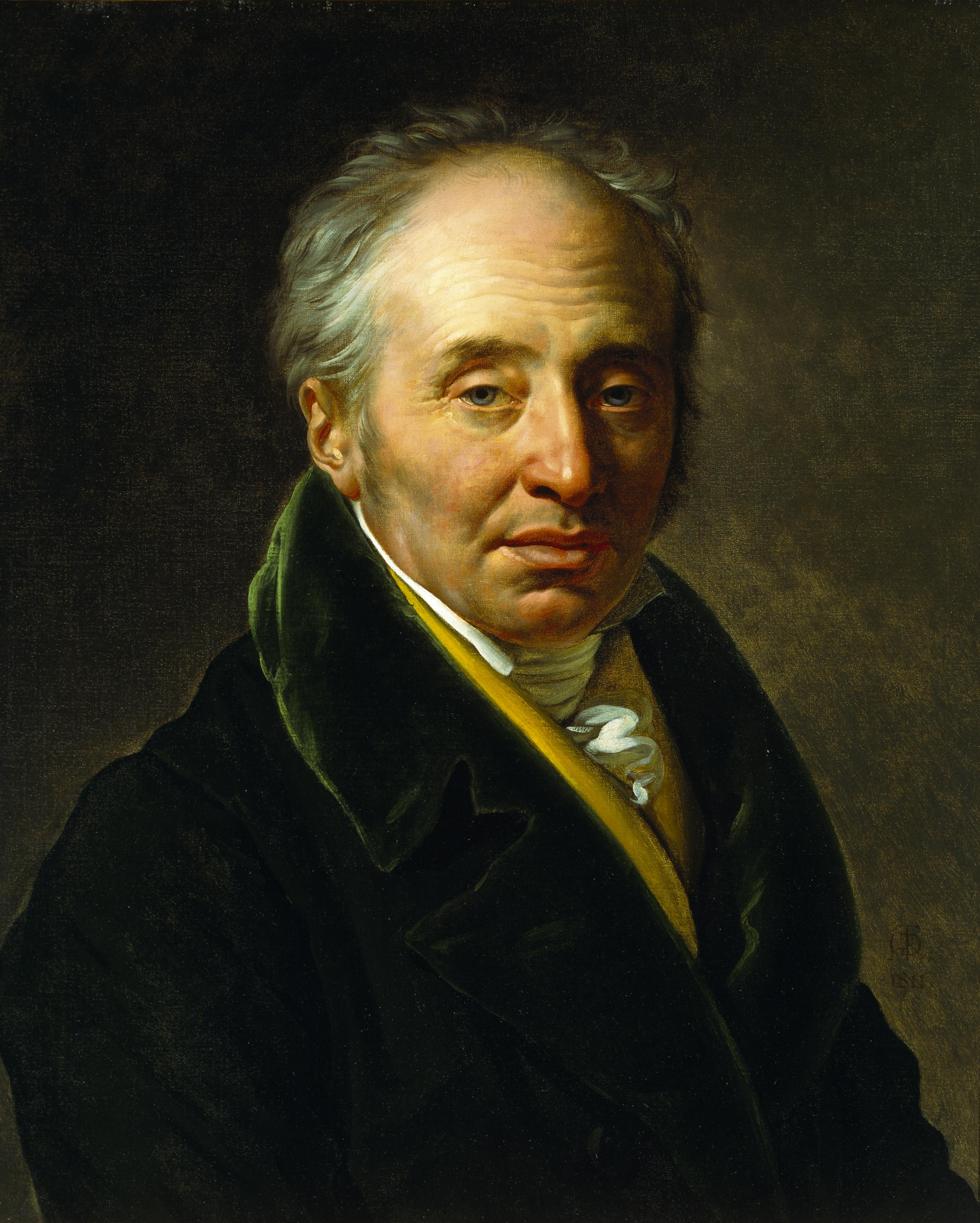
Portrait of Charles-Louis Balzac, 1811, Dallas Museum of Art

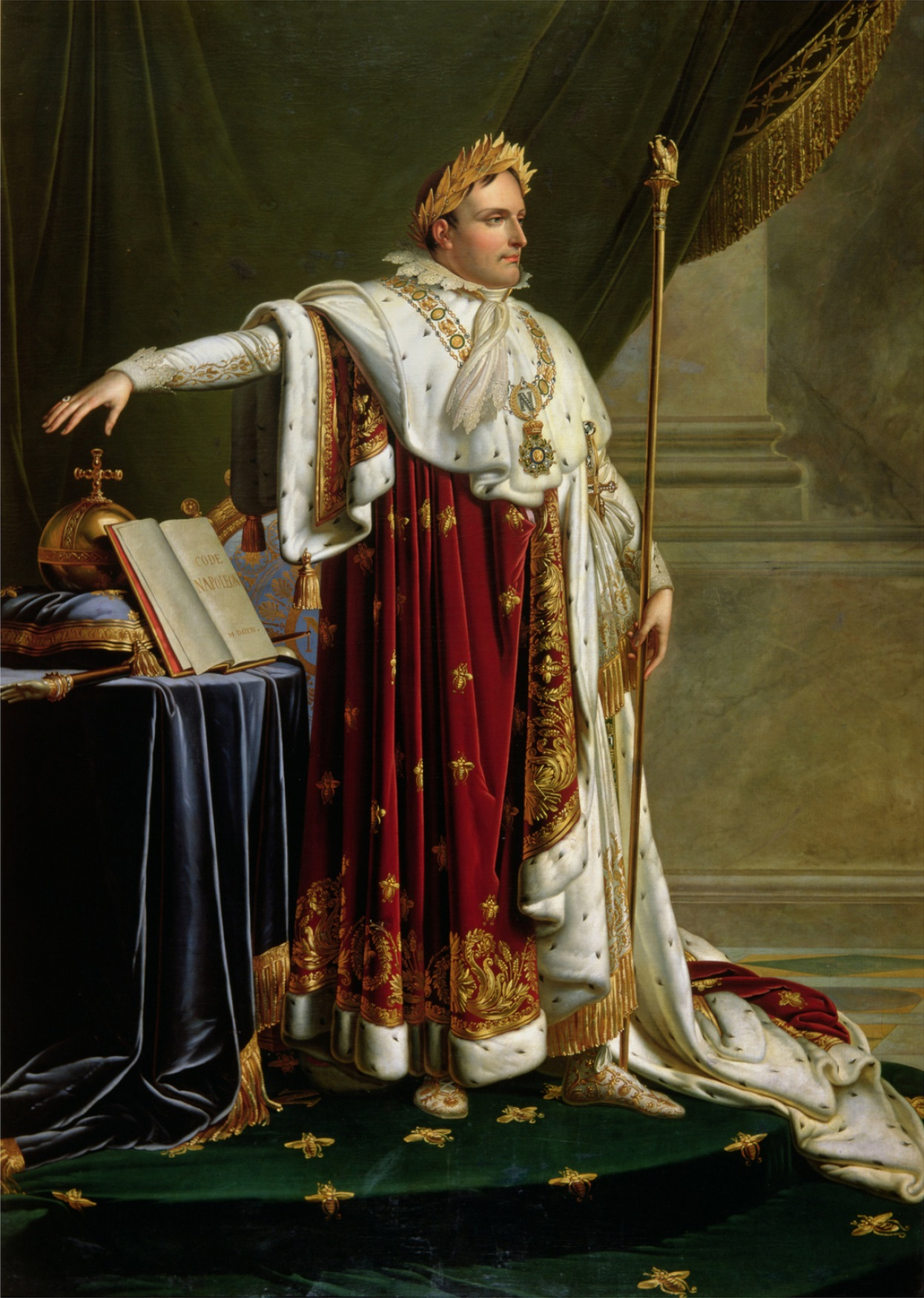
Napoleon I in Coronation Robes (Napoléon en costume impérial), c. 1812, Bowes Museum, England

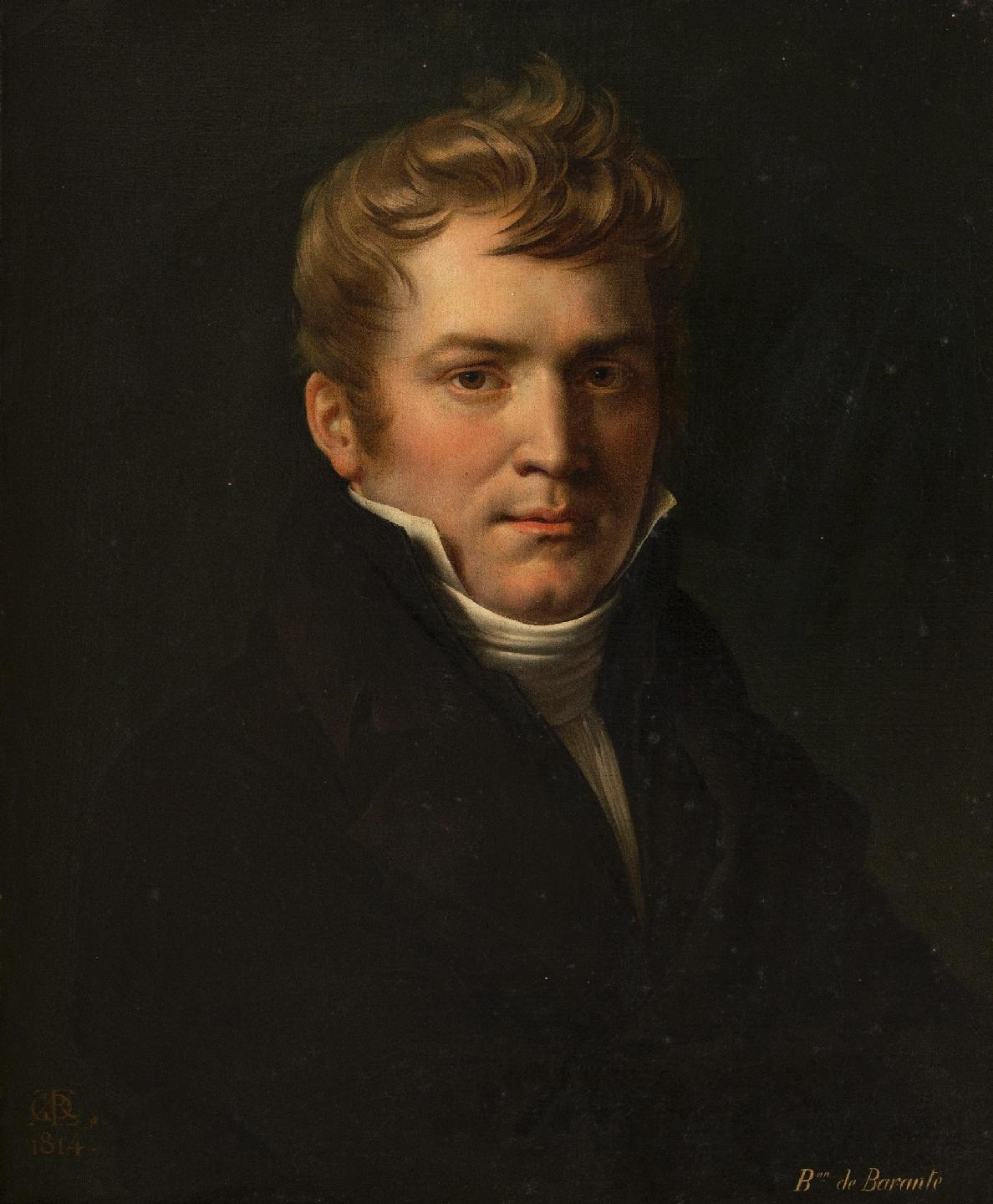
Portrait of Prosper de Barante, 1814, Musée d'art Roger-Quilliot, Clermont-Ferrand

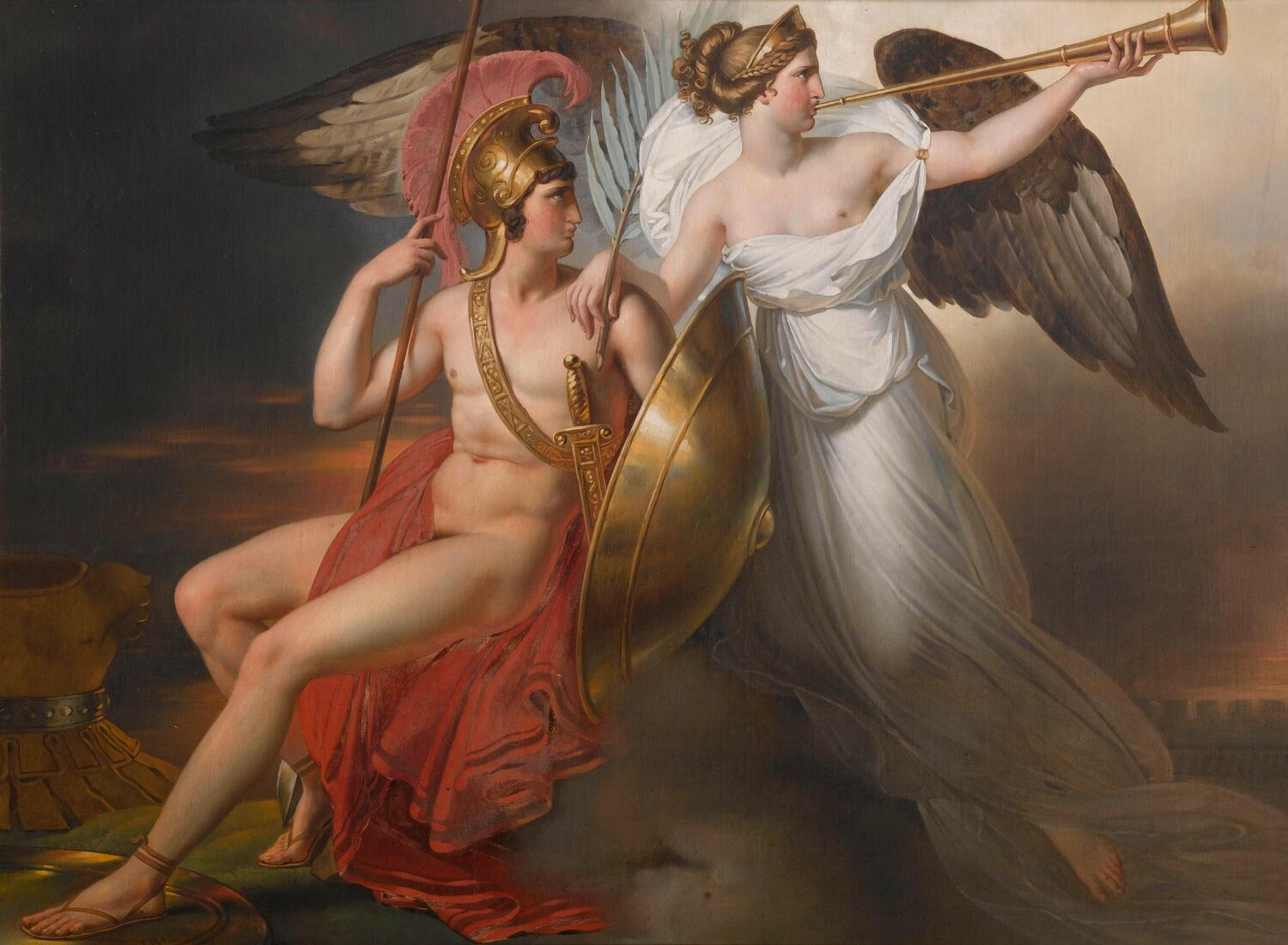
Allegory of Victory, c. 1815, Château de Compiègne

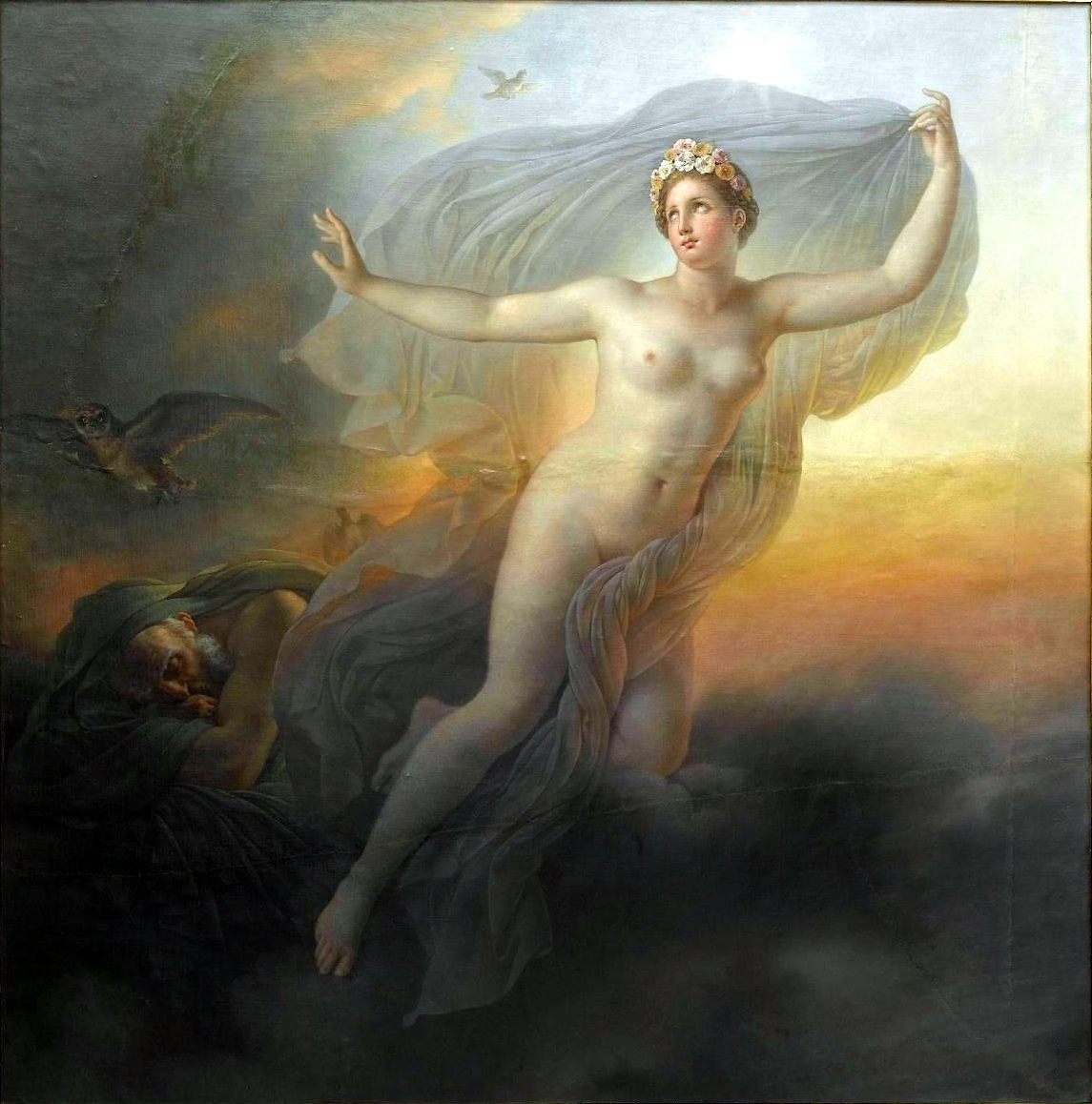
Aurora, c. 1815, Château de Compiègne

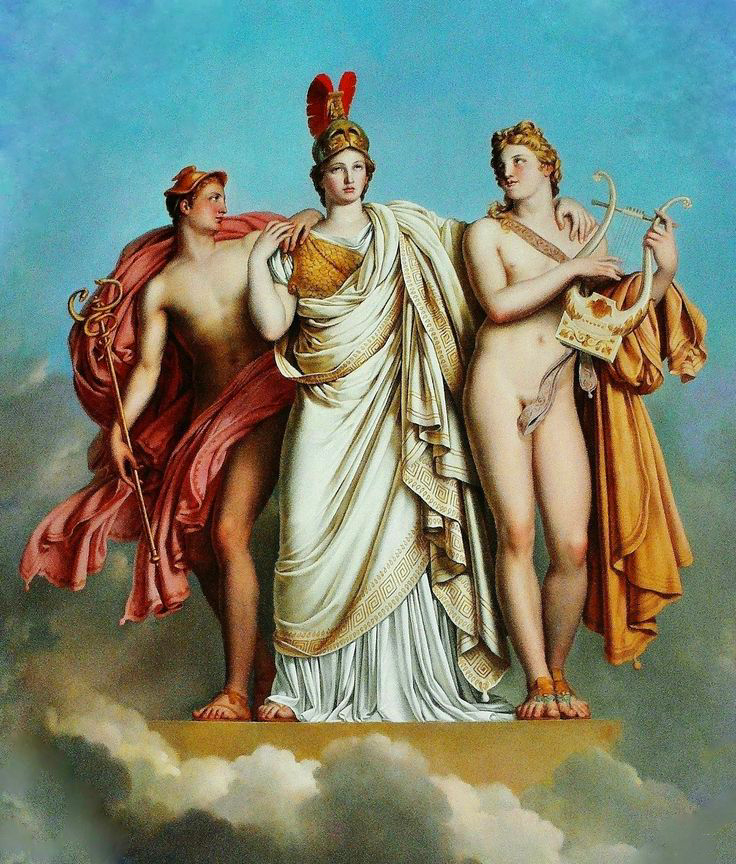
Minerva between Apollo and Mercury, c. 1815, Château de Compiègne

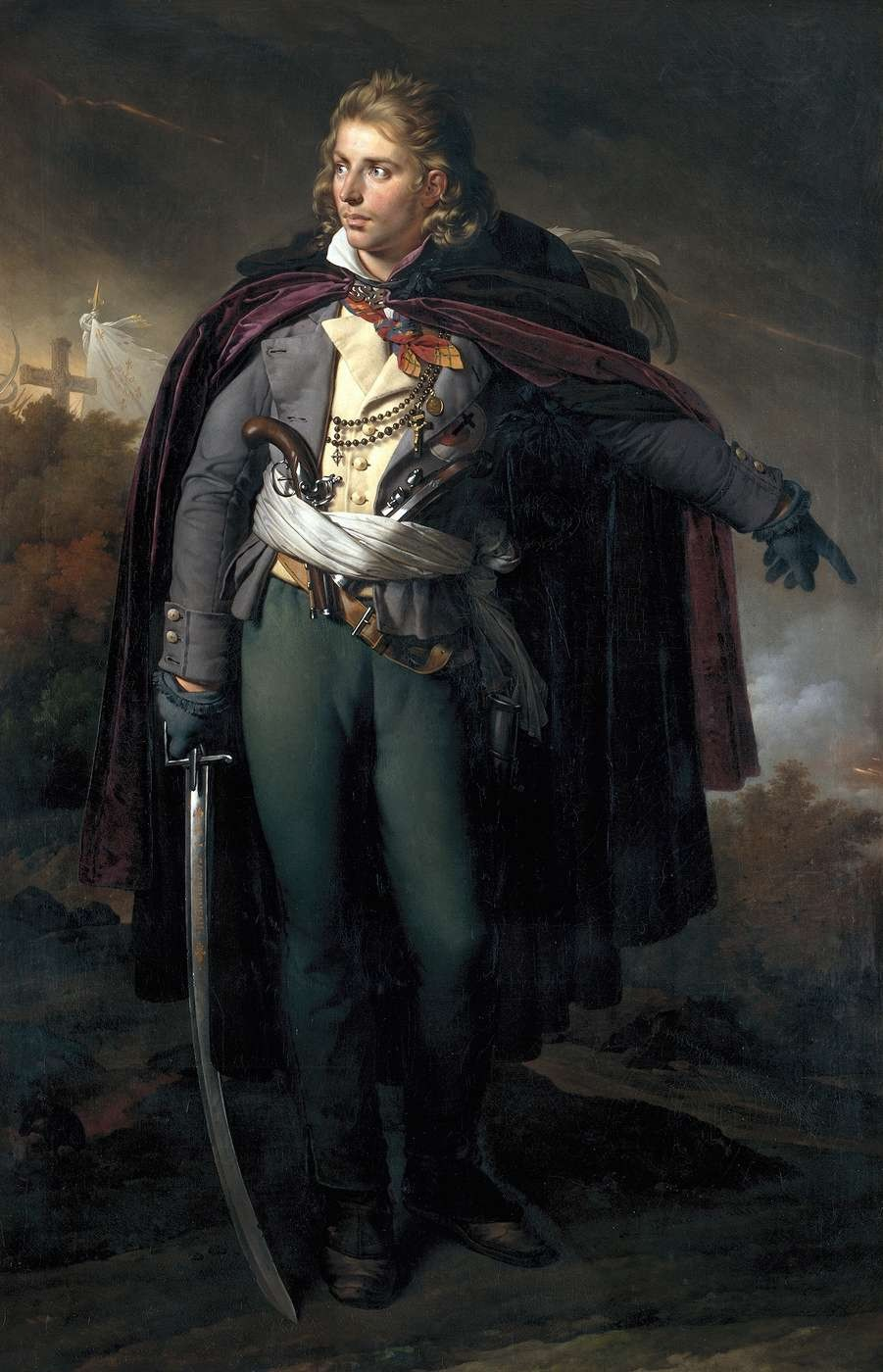
Jacques Cathelineau, généralissime vendéen, 1816, Musée d'art et d'histoire de Cholet

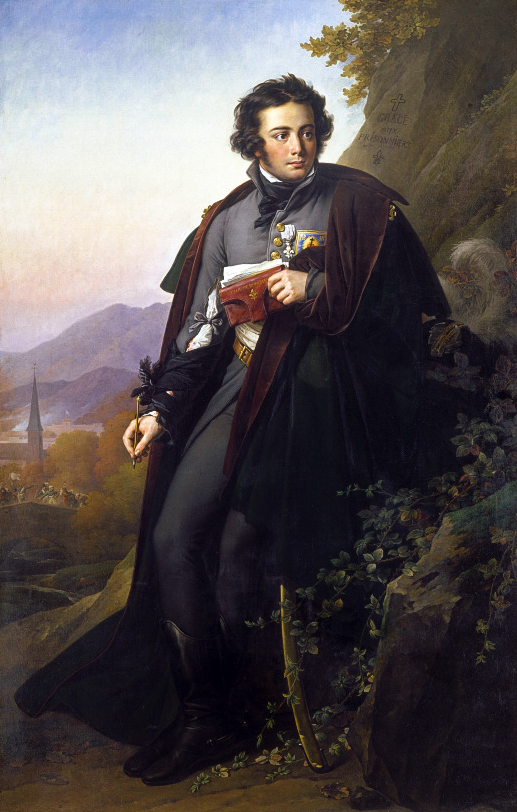
Charles-Melchior Arthus, Marquis de Bonchamps, 1816, Musée d'art et d'histoire de Cholet

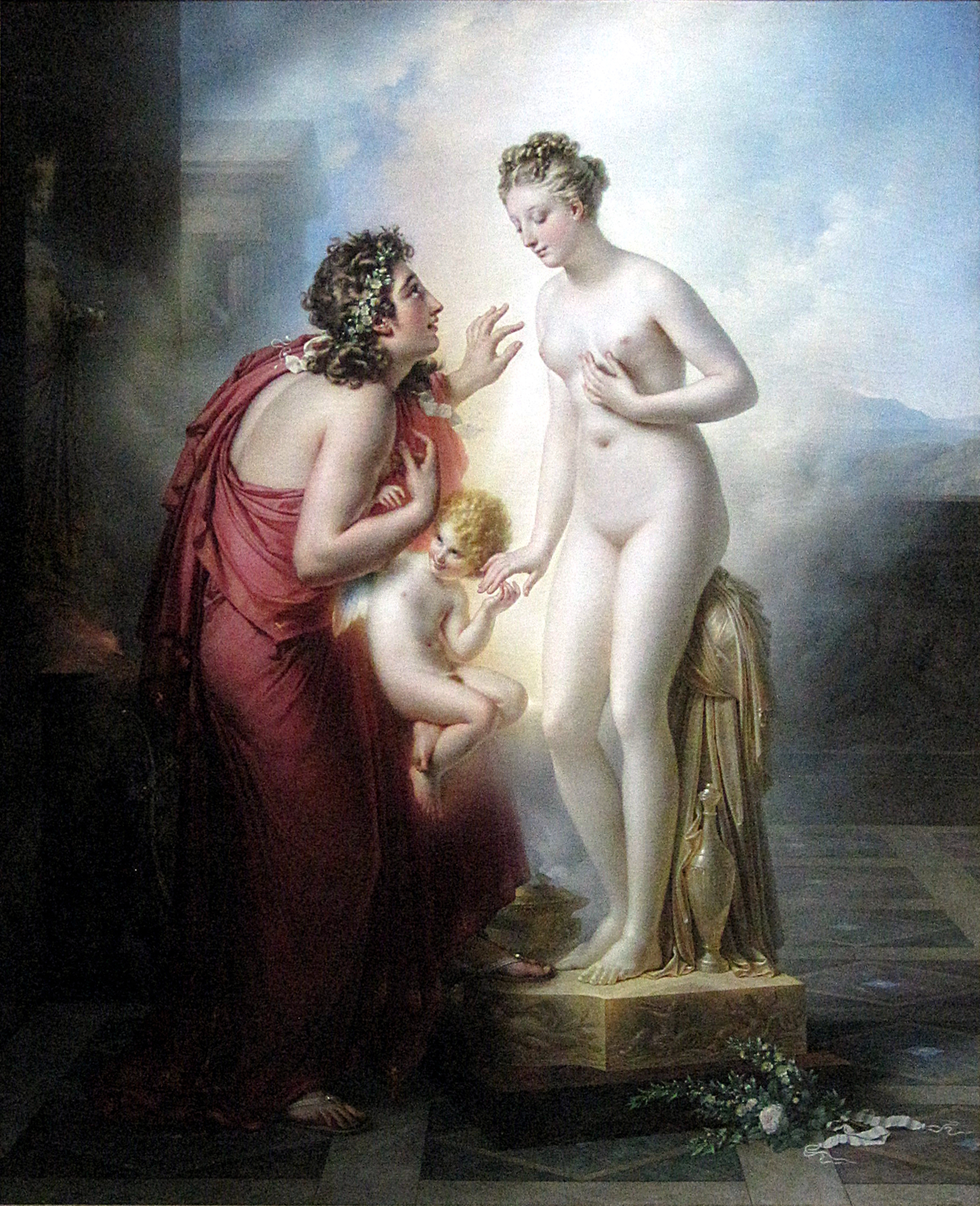
Pygmalion et Galatée, 1819, Château de Dampierre

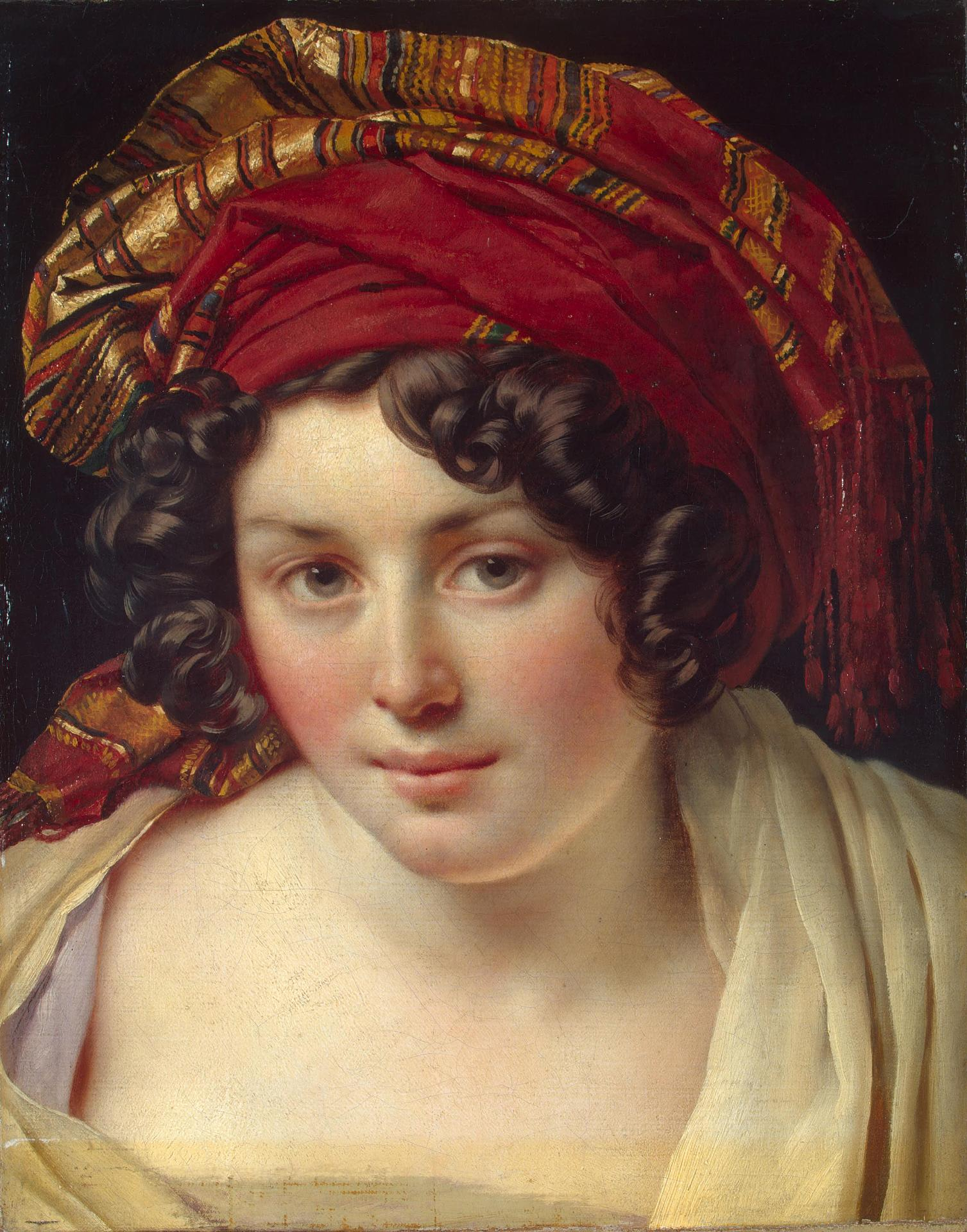
Head of a Woman in a Turban, c. 1820, Hermitage Museum, Saint Petersburg

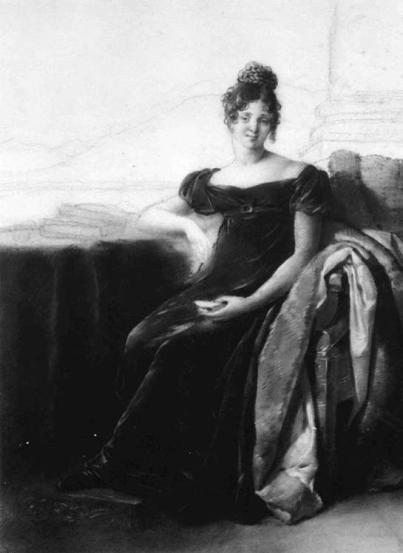
Portrait de Madame Reizet assise, 1820

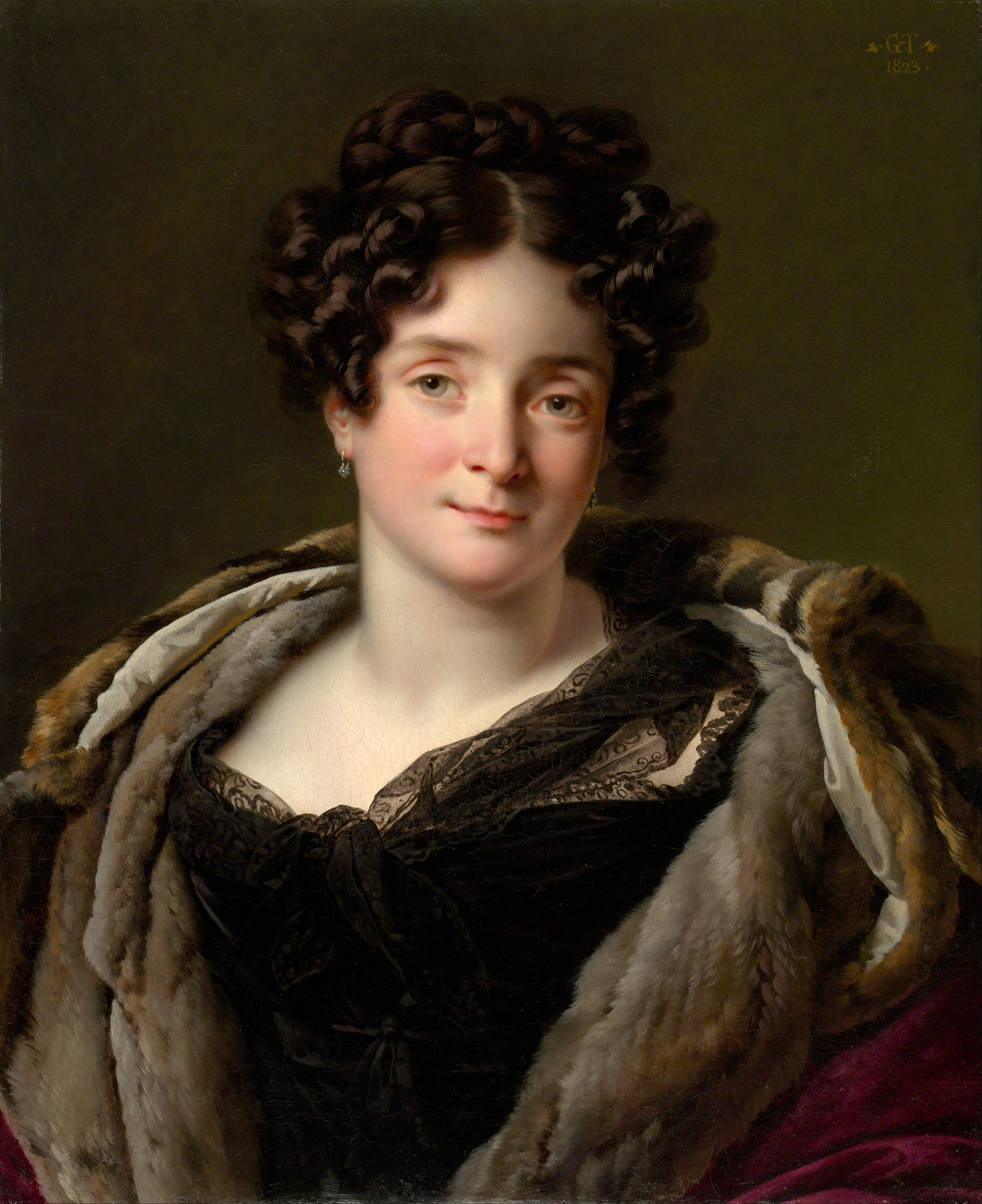
Portrait of Madame Reiset, 1823, Metropolitan Museum of Art

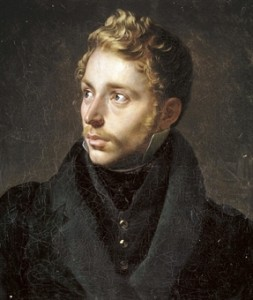
Portrait of Jacques-Joseph de Cathelineau (1787–1832), son of the généralissime

Capaneus, Leader of The Seven against Thebes (Tête du Blasphémateur), study for Les sept chefs devant Thèbes, Nationalmuseum, Stockholm

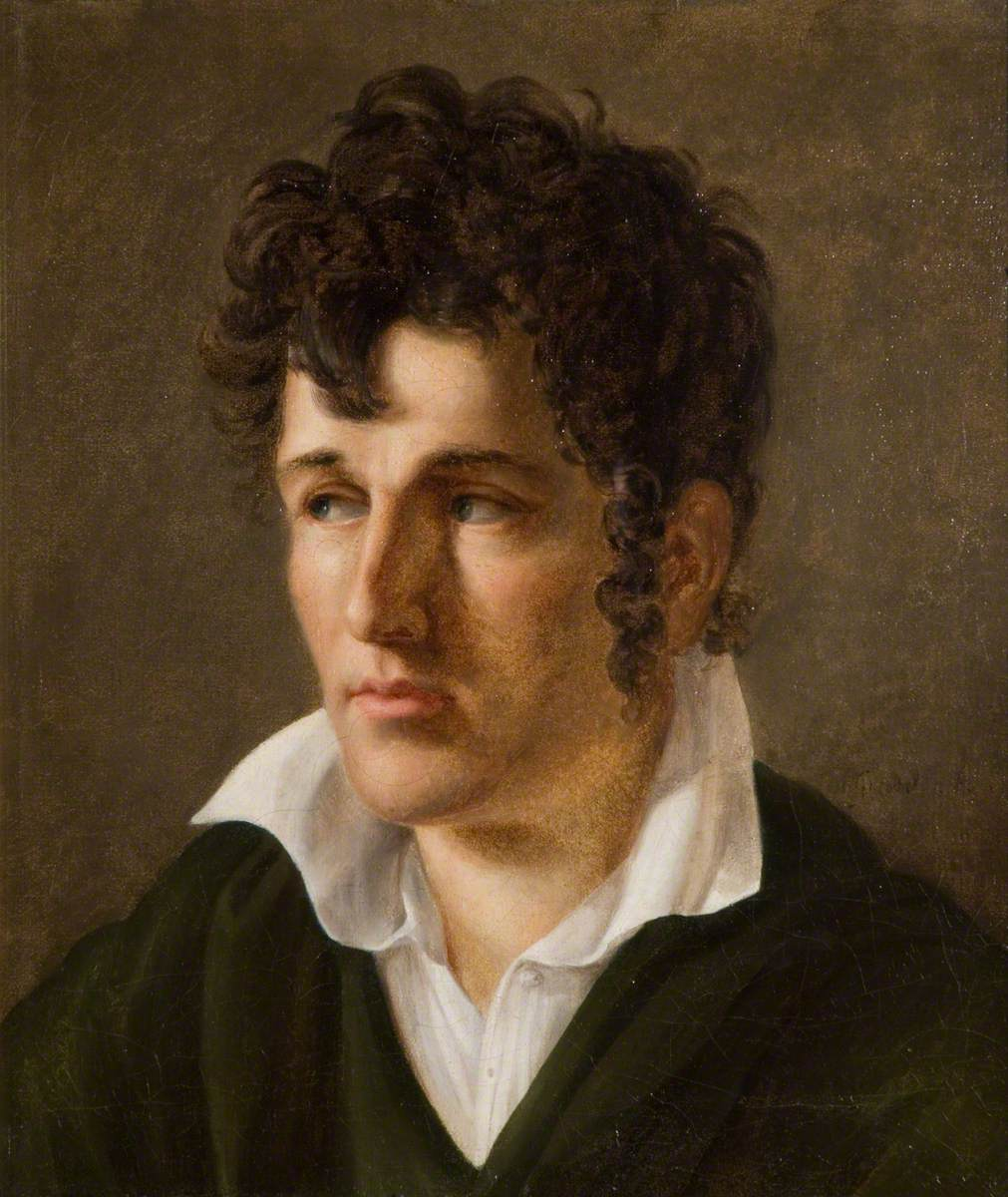
Undated portrait of François-René de Chateaubriand

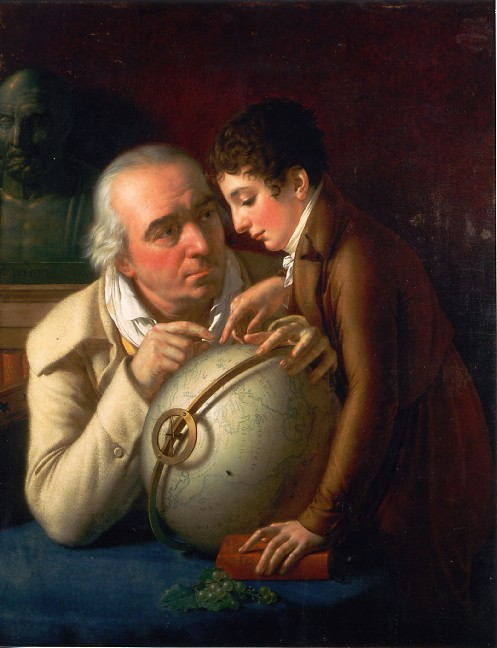
Portrait du Docteur Trioson donnant une leçon de géographie à son fils, undated, Musée Girodet, Montargis

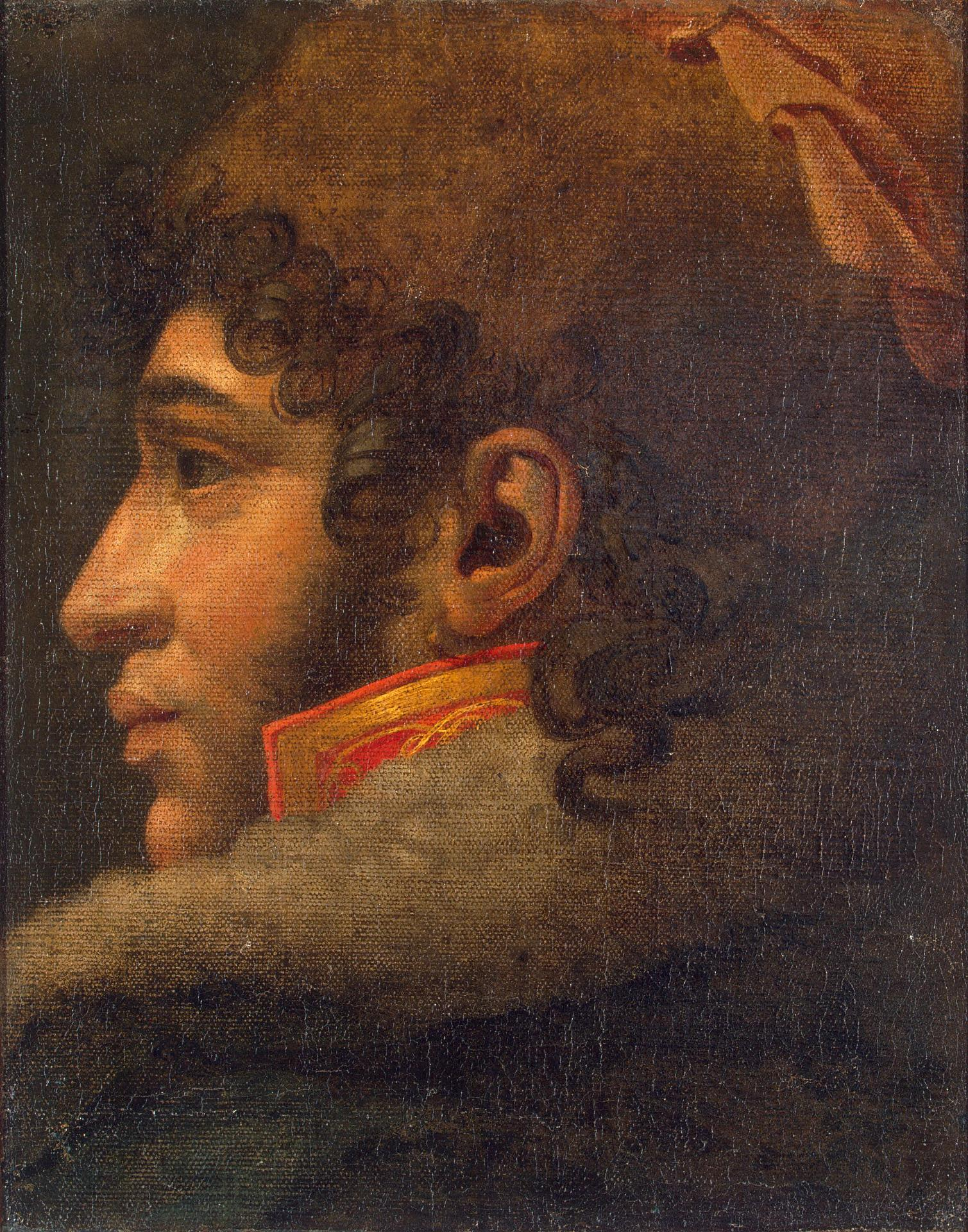
Portrait of Joachim Murat (?), Hermitage Museum

== See also ==
- List of Orientalist artists
