= Salon of 1806 =

1806 art exhibition in Paris

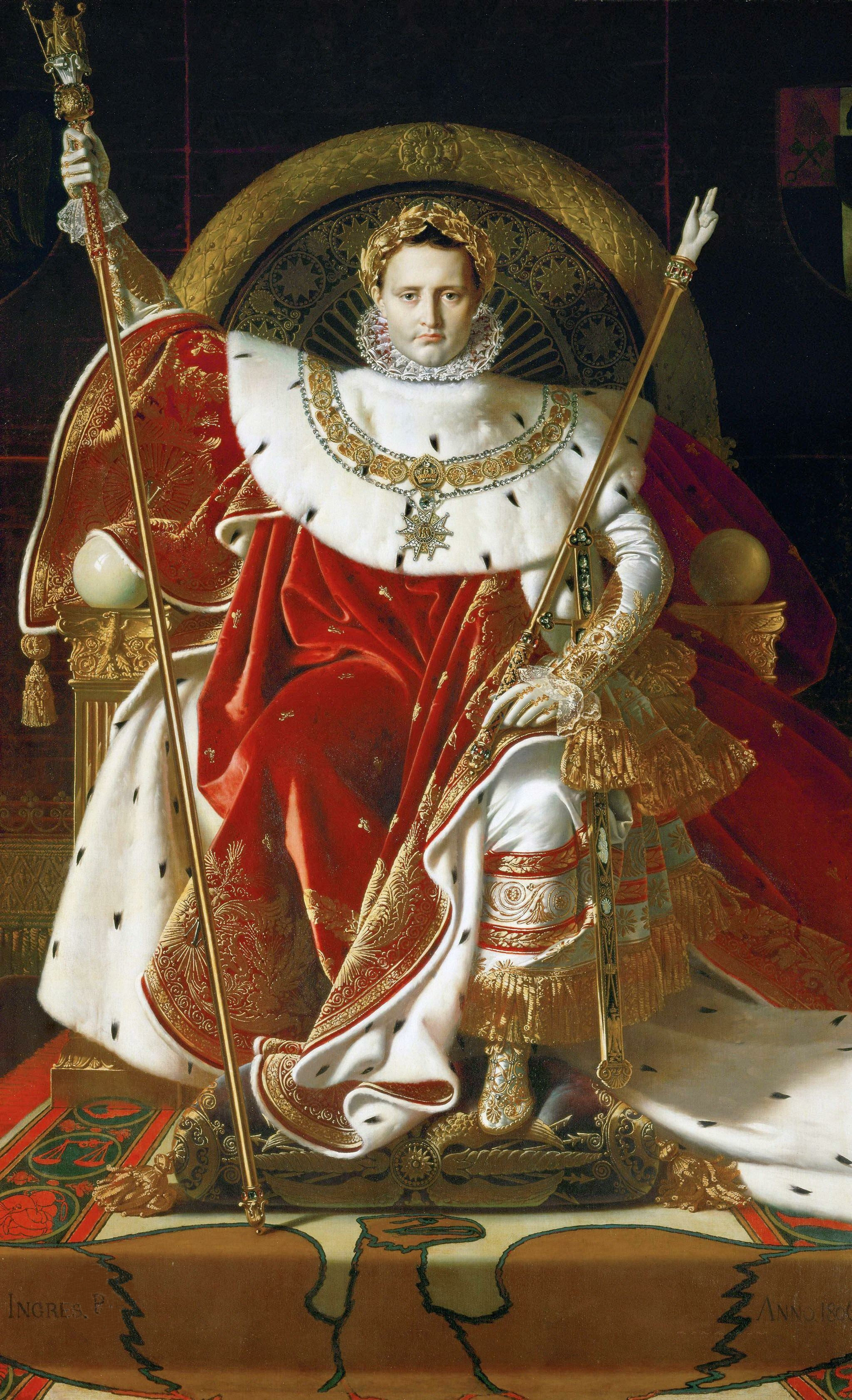
Napoleon I on His Imperial Throne by Jean-Auguste-Dominique Ingres

The Salon of 1806 was an art exhibition held at the Louvre in Paris. During the Napoleonic era the Salon was held biannually and featured paintings, sculptures and engravings. Military conquest was the theme of the exhibition, featuring numerous references to the campaigns of Napoleon. Amongst these were a bust of Napoleon by Lorenzo Bartolini and the battle paintings The Battle of Aboukir by Antoine-Jean Gros, The Battle of the Pyramids by Louis-François Lejeune and Napoleon Honours Unfortunate Courage by Jean Baptiste Debret in which the Emperor is shown saluting the bravery of his wounded Austrian enemies. Jean Broc's The Death of General Desaix portrays the death of Louis Desaix at the Battle of Marengo.

The Emperor was also represented in portraiture by Napoleon I on His Imperial Throne by Jean-Auguste-Dominique Ingres as was his sister Pauline Bonaparte who had sat for Robert Lefèvre. Ingres also submitted a noted Self-portrait of himself. Also on display were neoclassical paintings such as Scene from a Deluge by Anne-Louis Girodet de Roussy-Trioson and Theseus and Pirithous by Angélique Mongez. Henriette Lorimier was awarded a gold medal for her painting of Joan of Navarre. Pierre-Nolasque Bergeret drew praise for his history painting Honours Rendered to Raphael on His Deathbed.

Critics were limited in what they could say by increasingly firm censorship by the Napoleonic authorities. It was followed by the Salon of 1808 which continued its theme of celebrating the Napoleonic regime and its military triumphs.

== Gallery ==
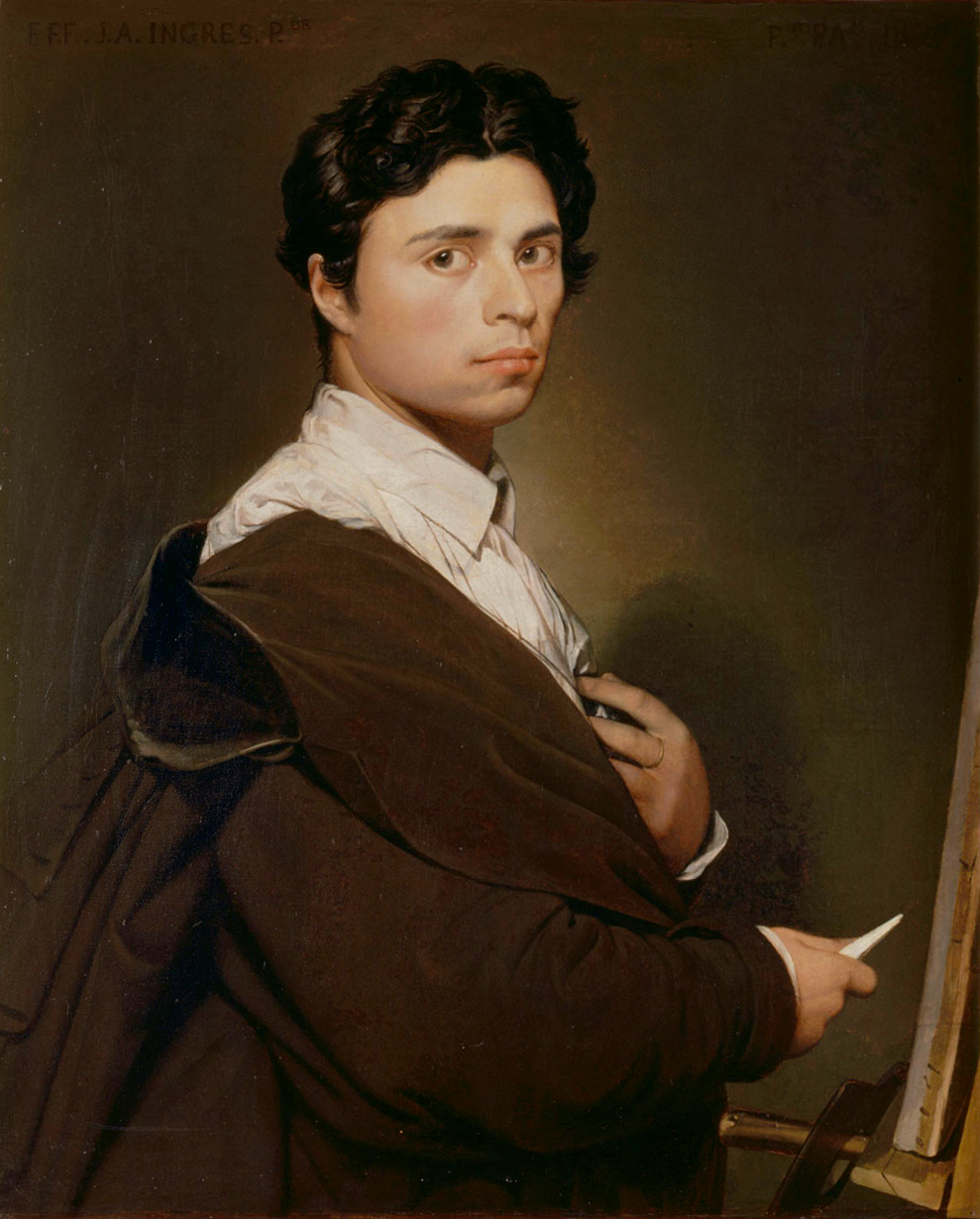
Self-portrait by Jean-Auguste-Dominique Ingres

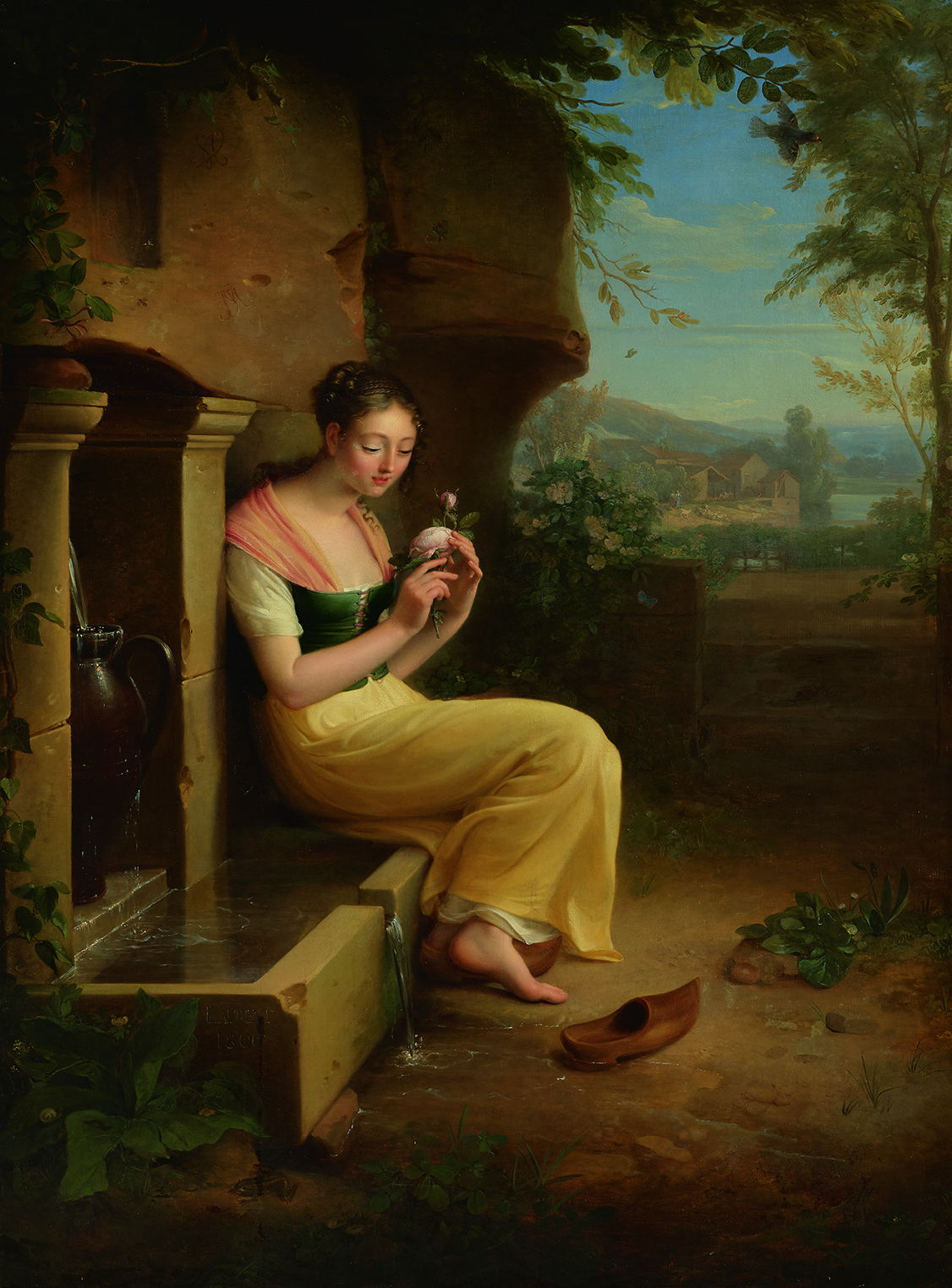
A Young Village Woman by Jean Antoine Laurent

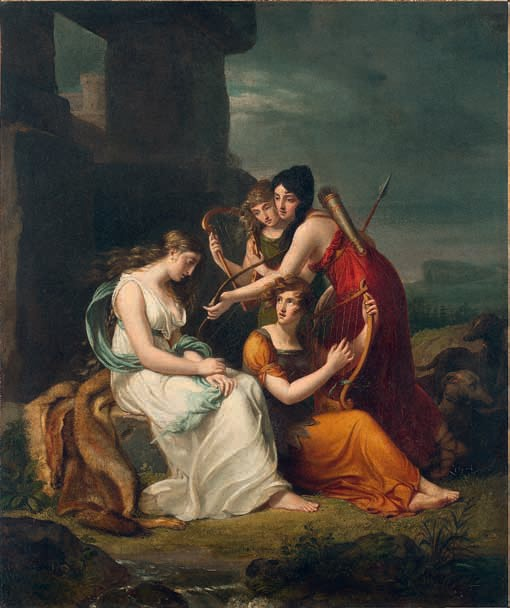
Malvina Lamenting the Death of Oscar by Elizabeth Harvey

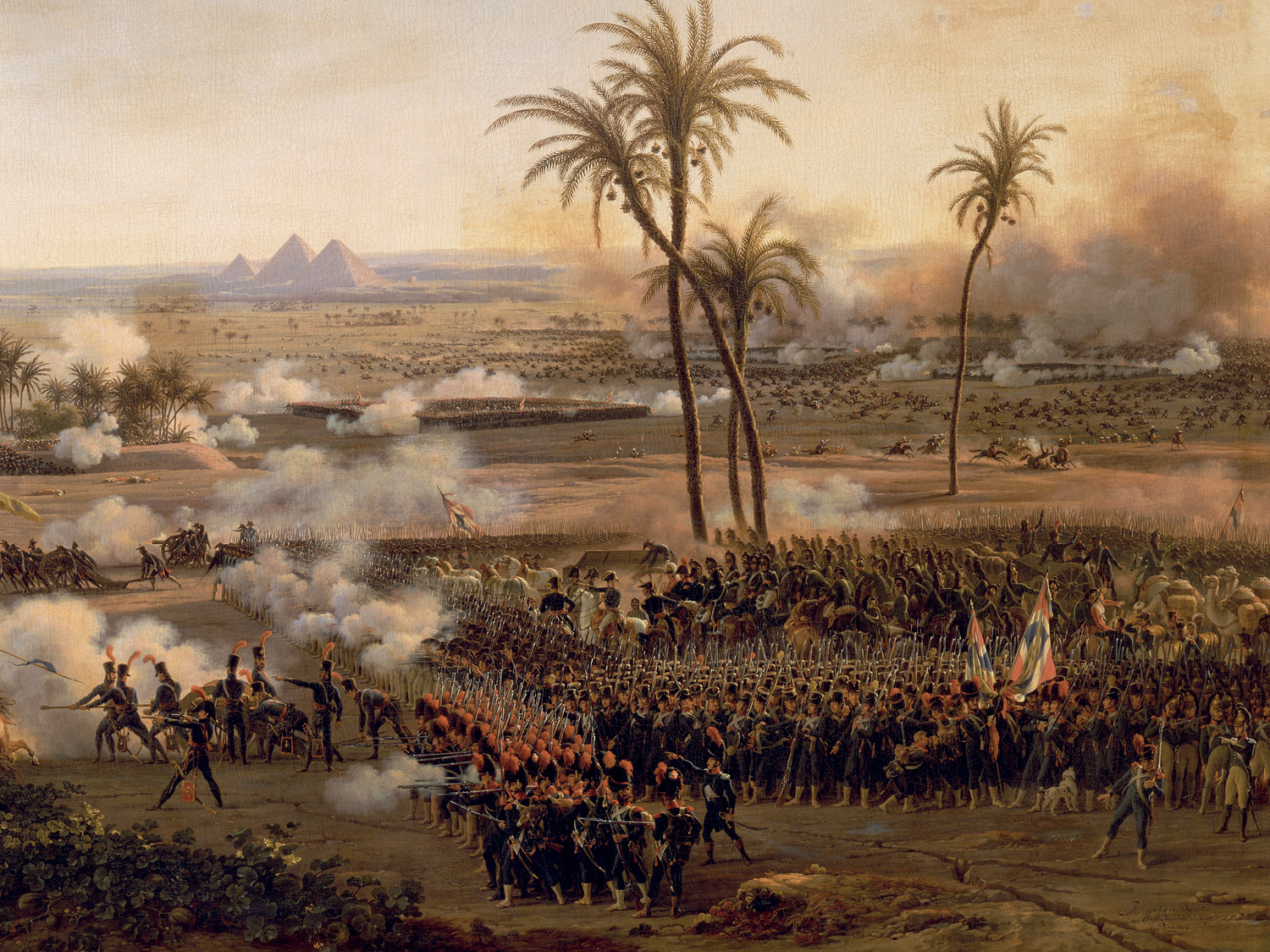
The Battle of the Pyramids by Louis-François Lejeune

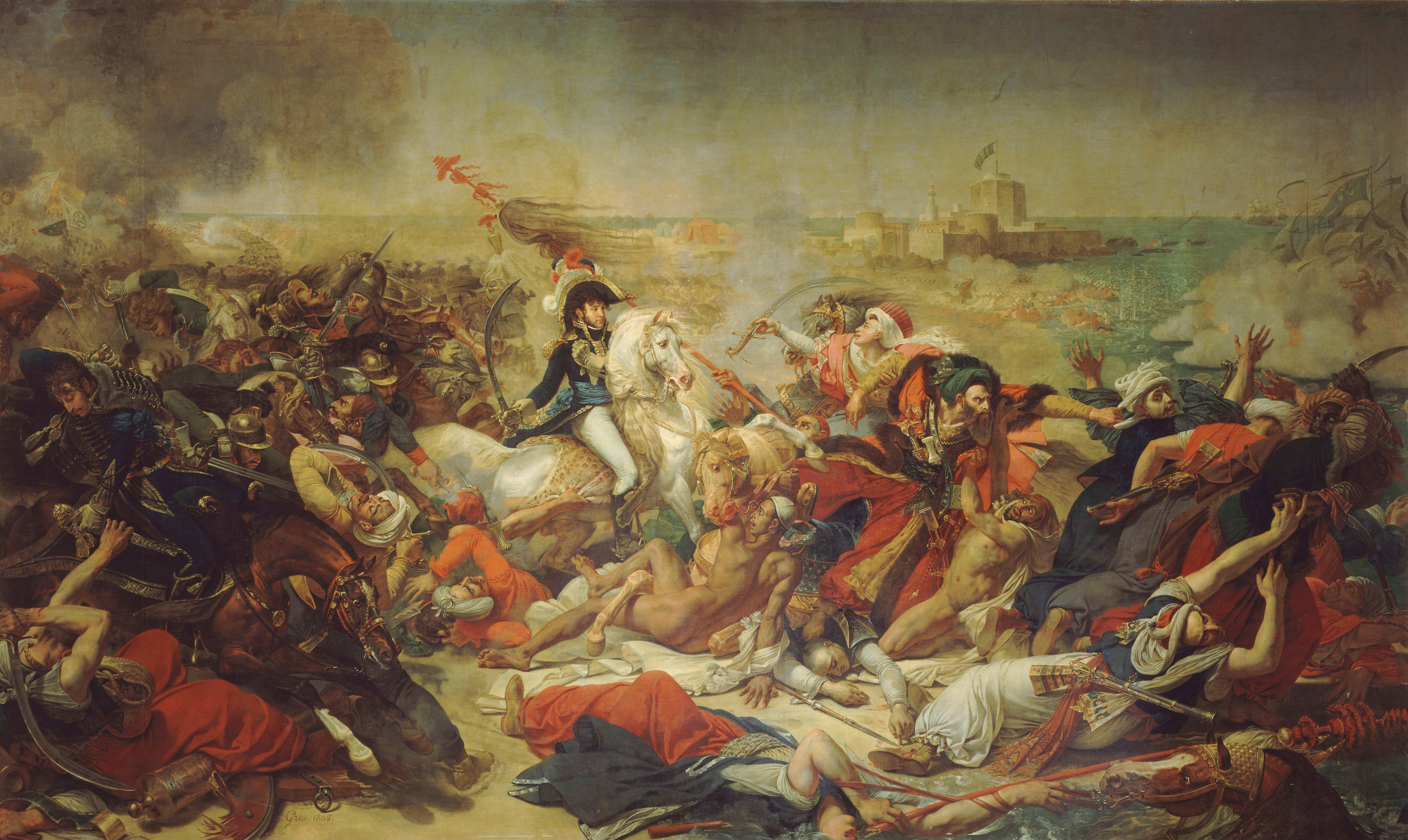
The Battle of Aboukir by Antoine-Jean Gros

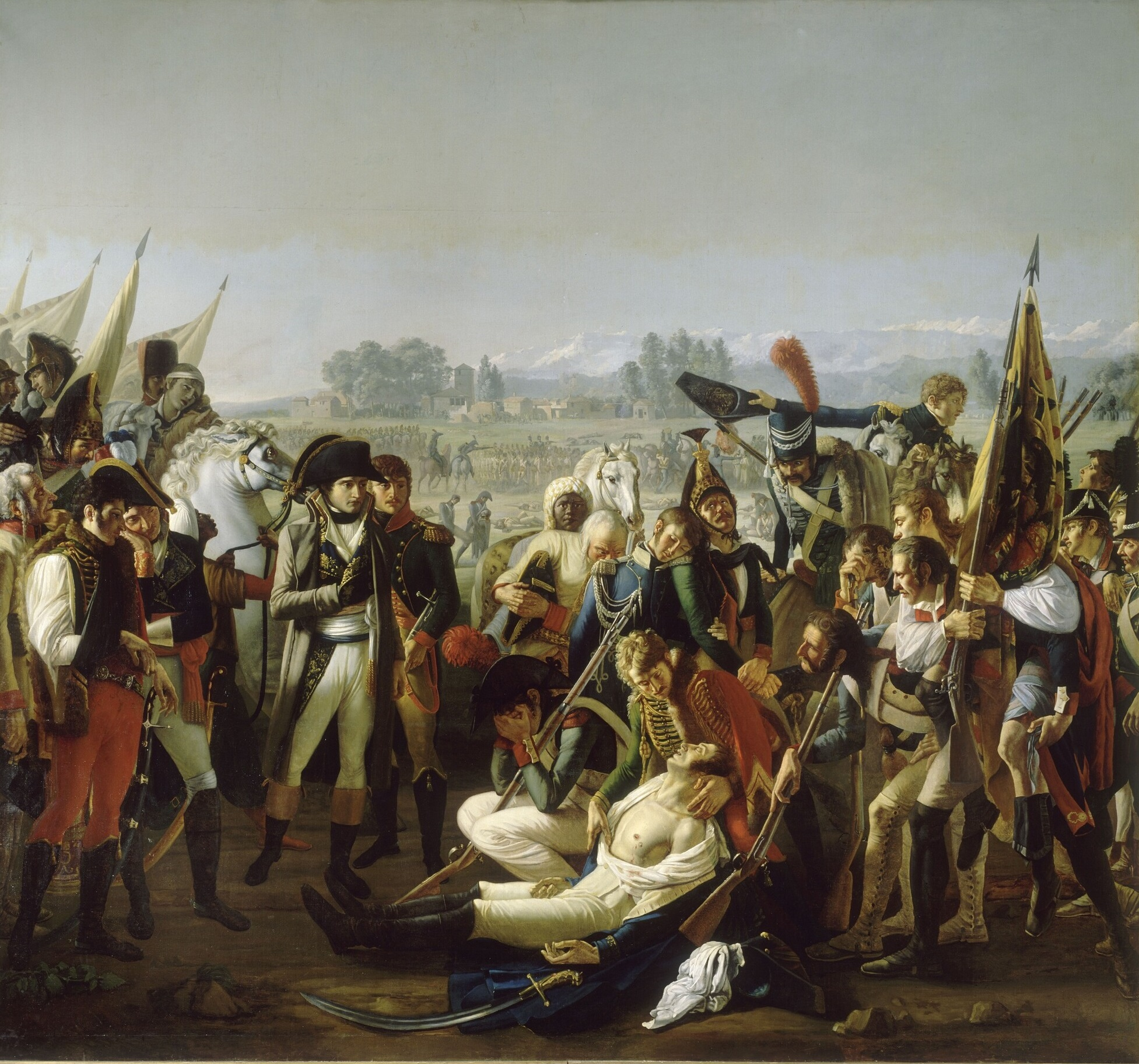
The Death of General Desaix by Jean Broc

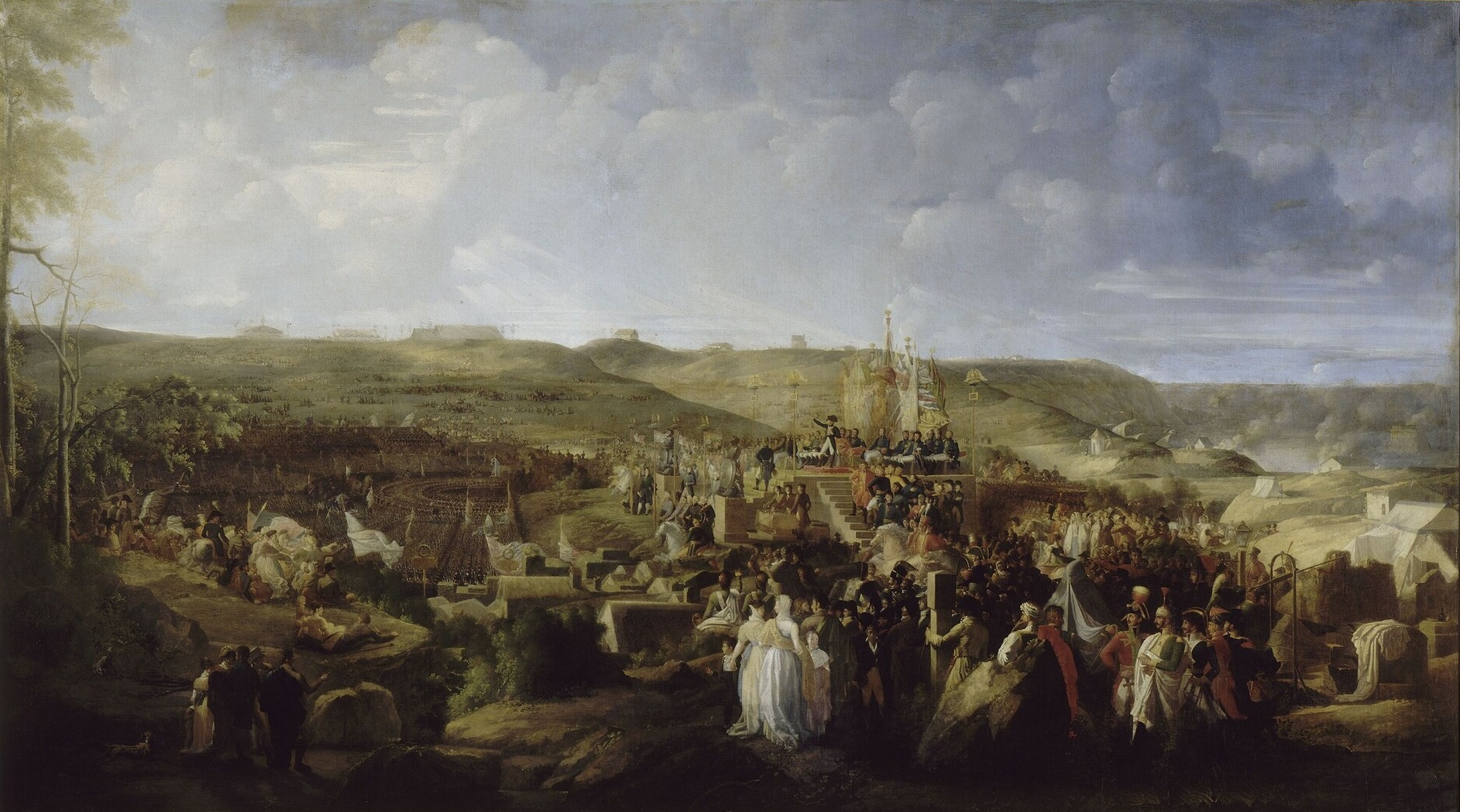
Napoleon Distributing the Legion of Honour at the Camp of Boulogne by Philippe-Auguste Hennequin

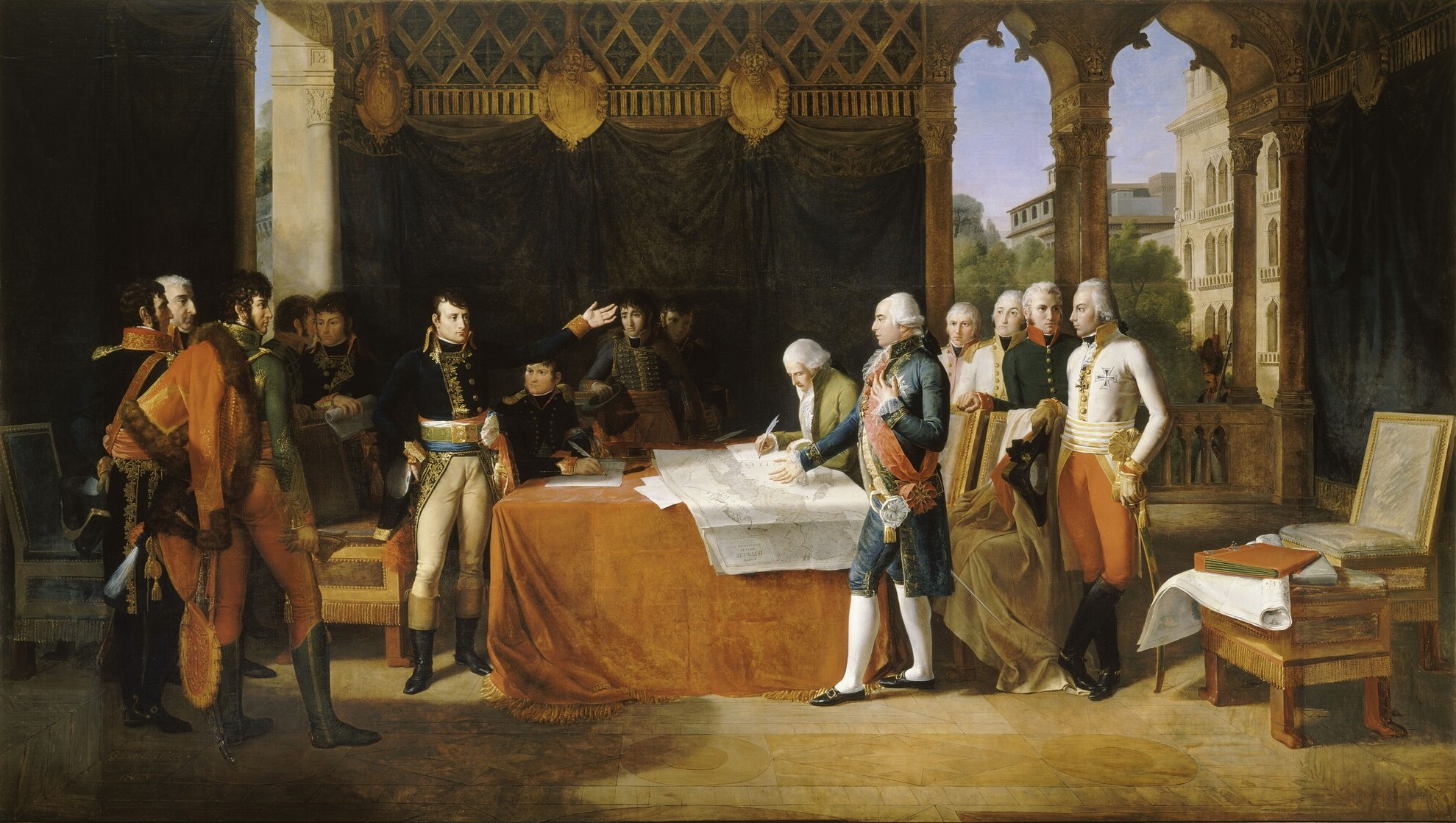
The Preliminary Peace Treaty at Leoben by Guillaume Guillon-Lethière

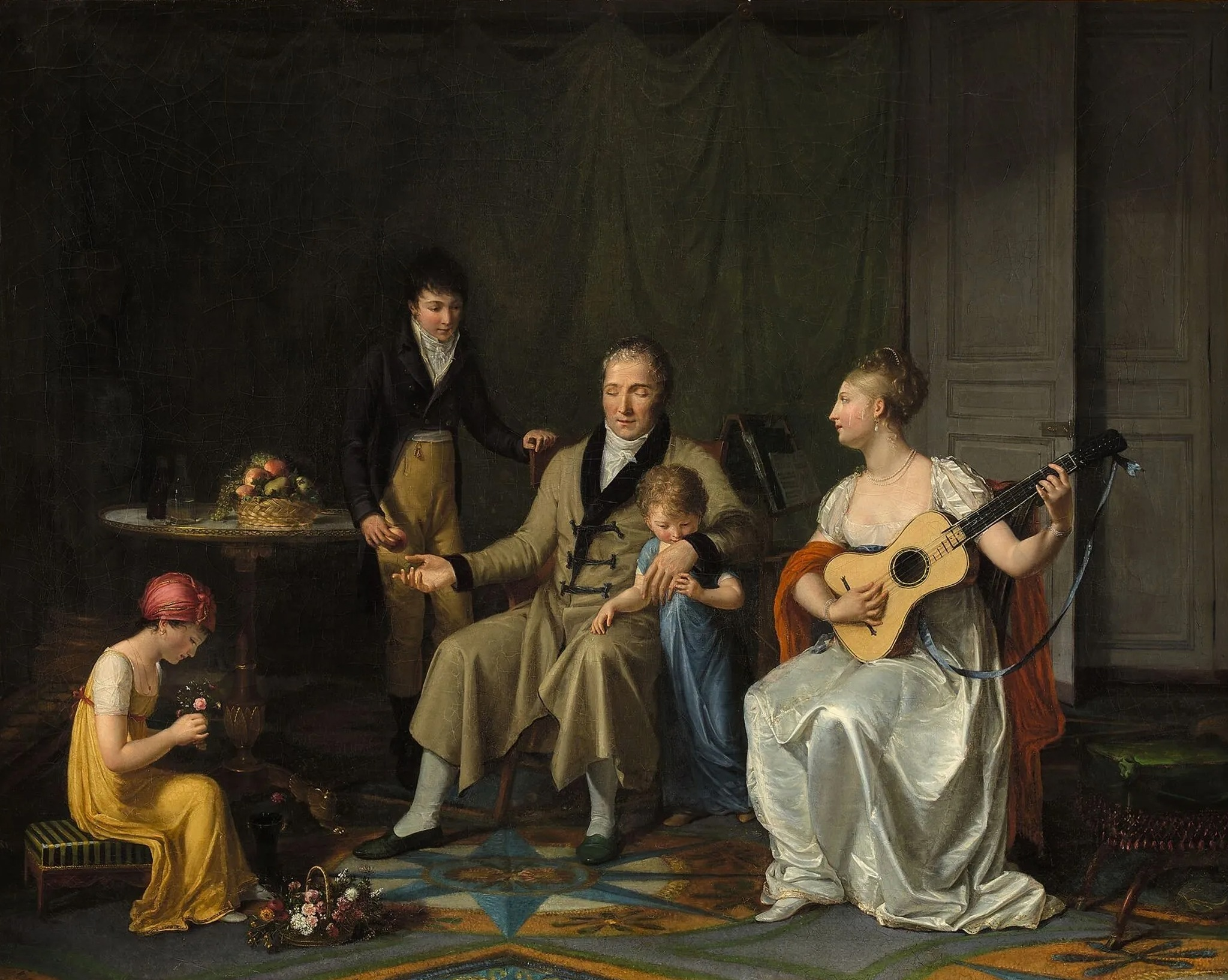
The Five Senses by Constance Marie Charpentier

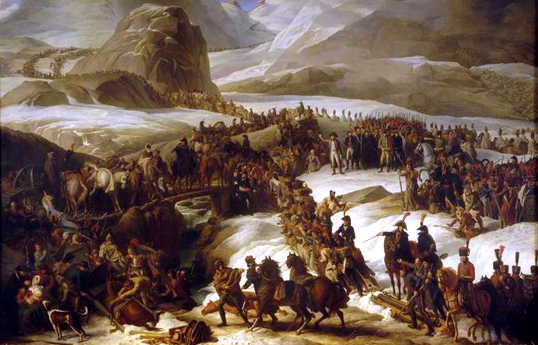
The French Army Crossing the St. Bernard Pass by Charles Thévenin

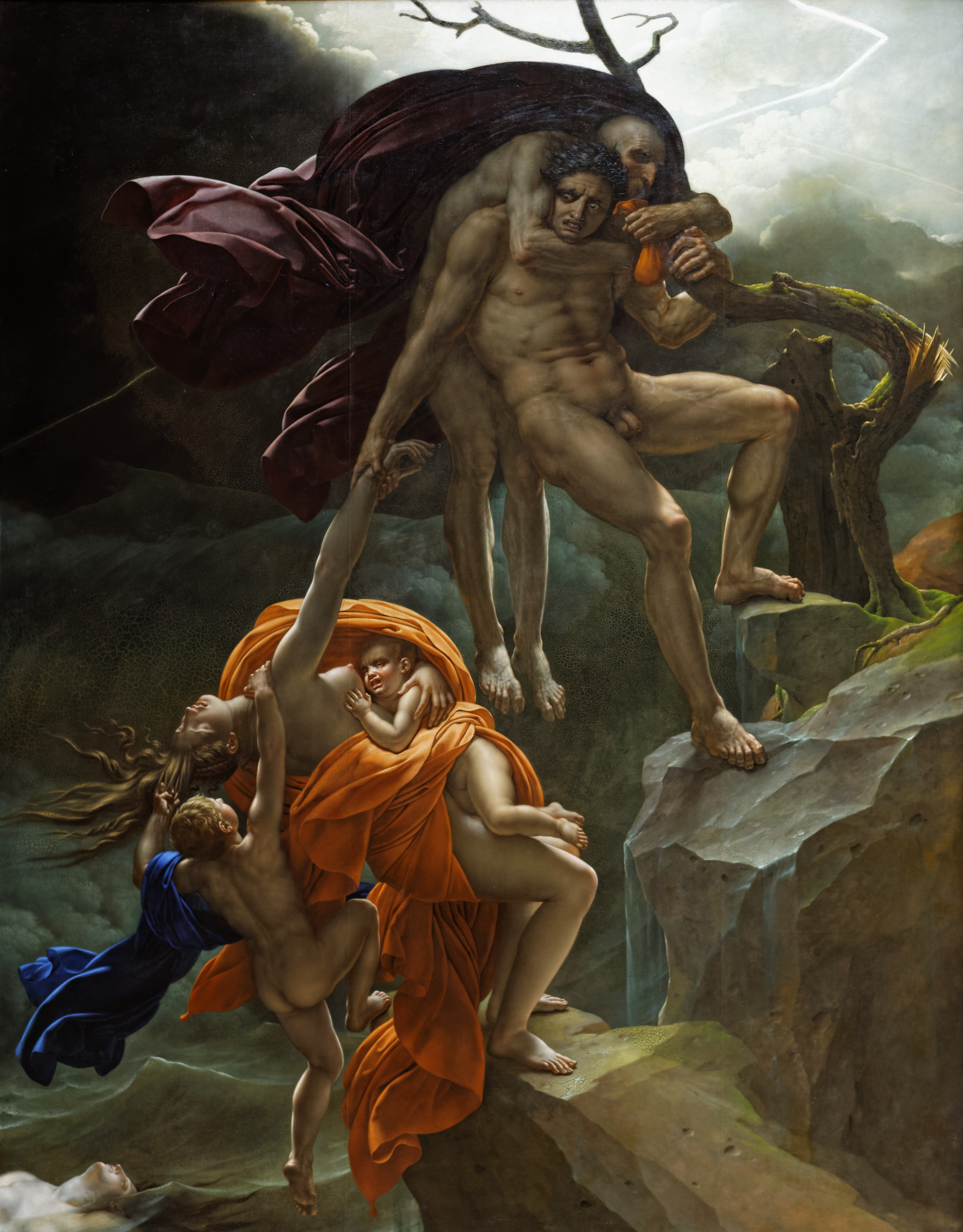
Scene from a Deluge by Anne-Louis Girodet de Roussy-Trioson

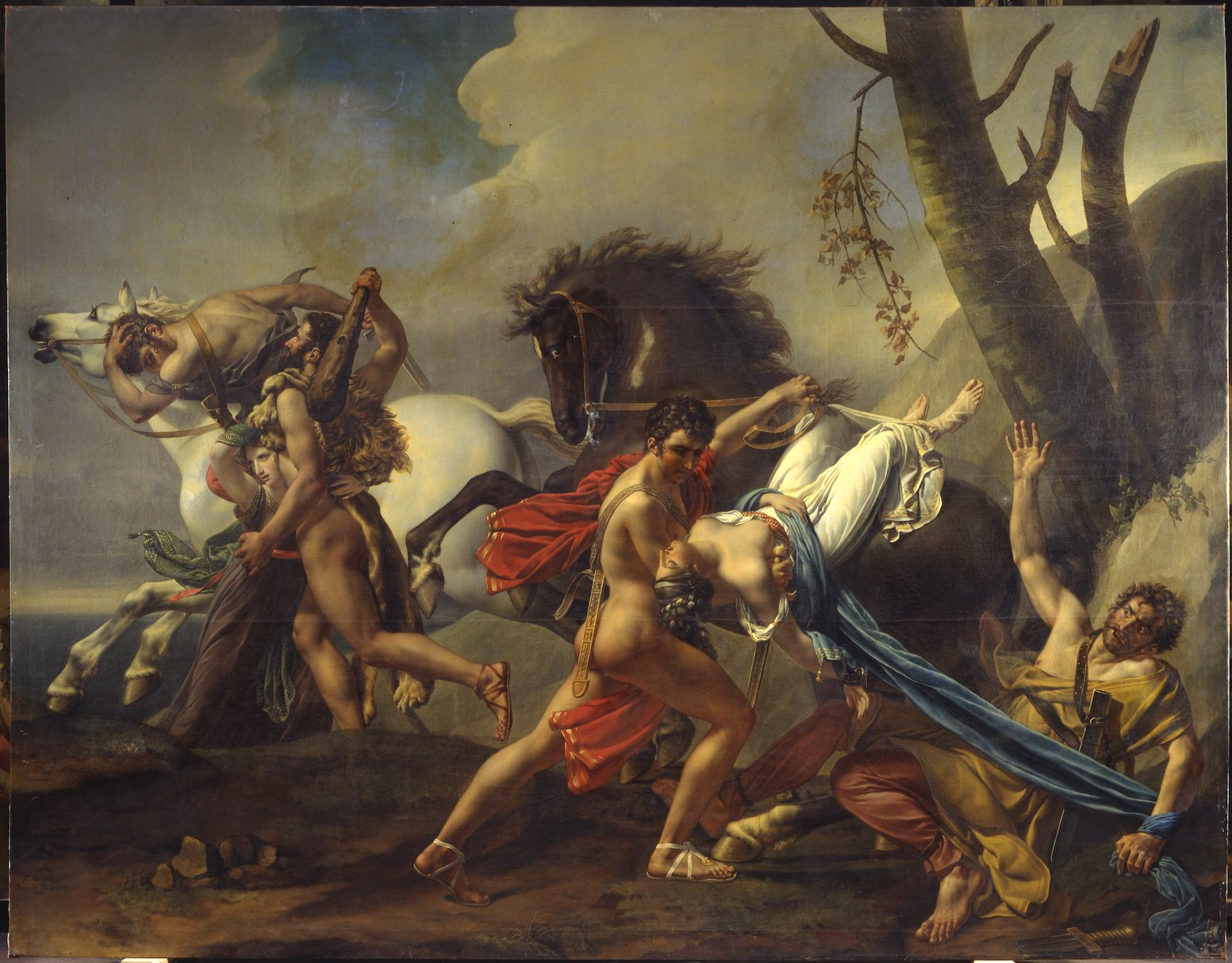
Theseus and Pirithous by Angélique Mongez

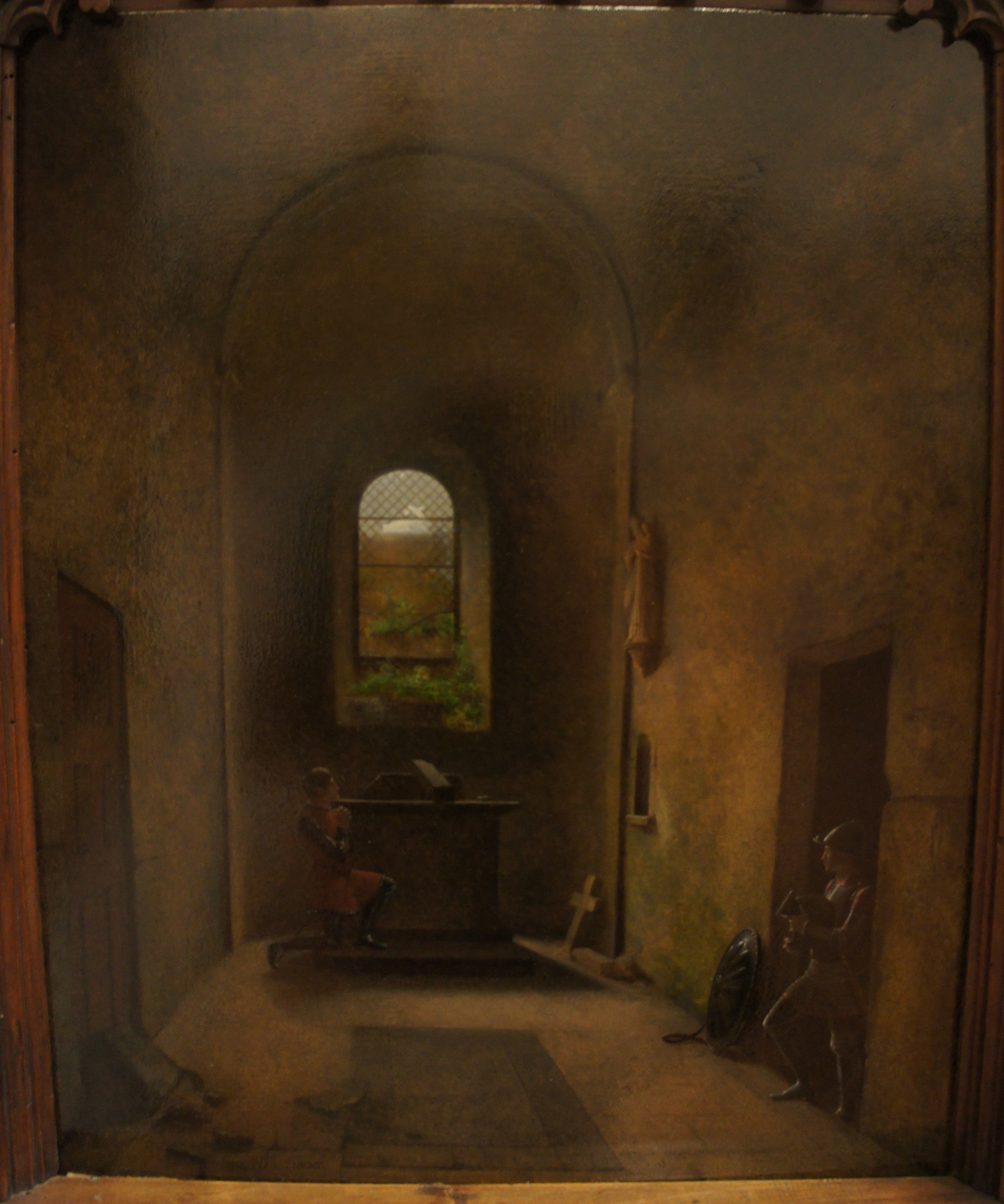
A Knight at Prayer in a Chapel, Preparing Himself for Combat by Fleury François Richard

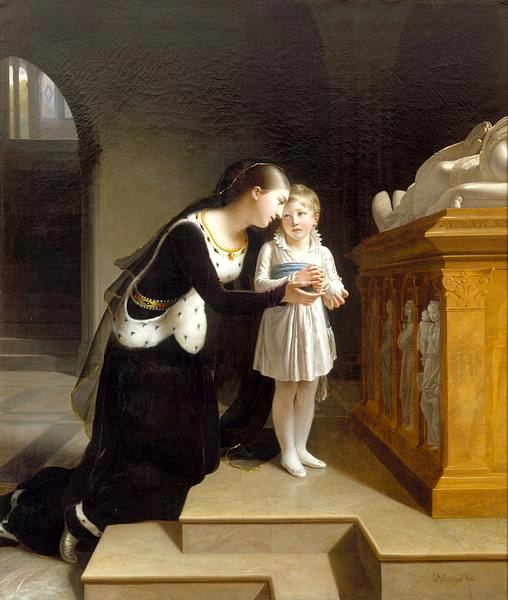
Joan of Navarre and son Arthur by Henriette Lorimier

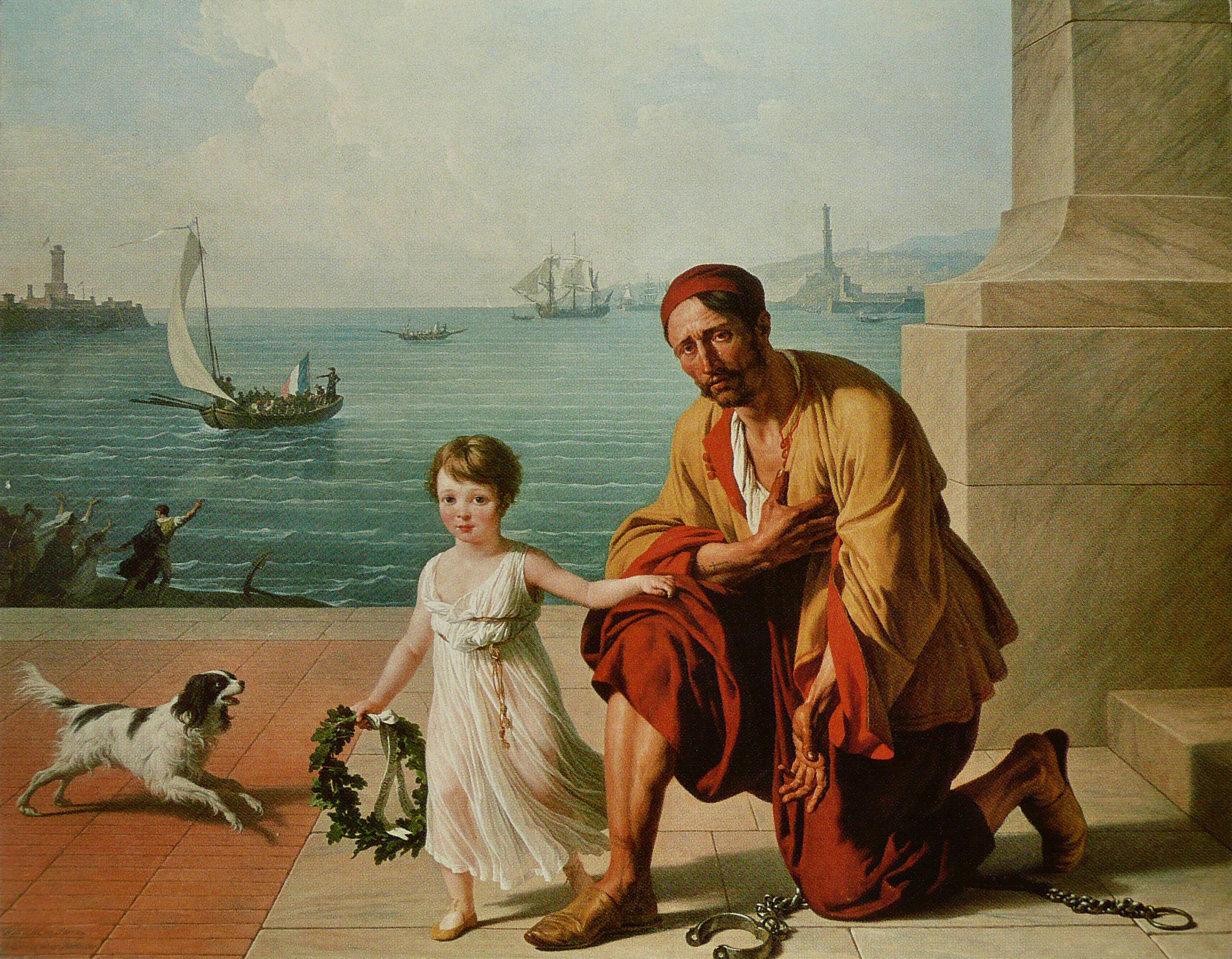
Allegory of Freedom for Ransomed Barbary Captives by François-André Vincent

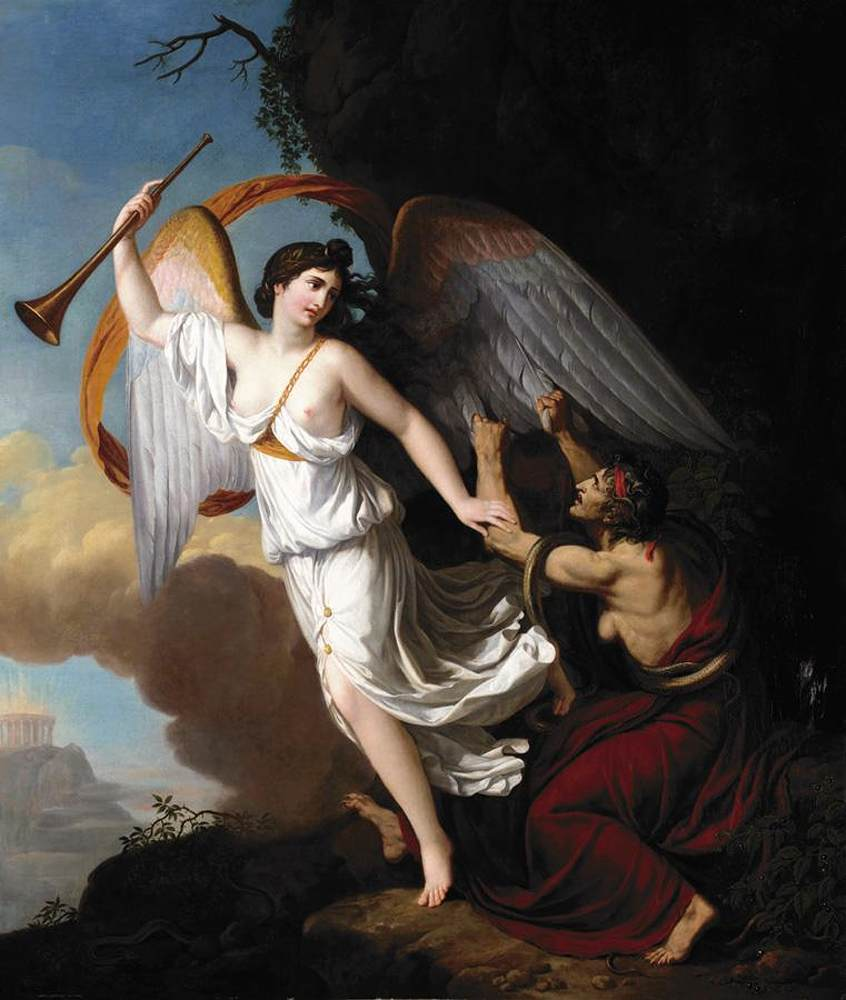
Envy Plucking the Wings of Fame by François-Guillaume Ménageot

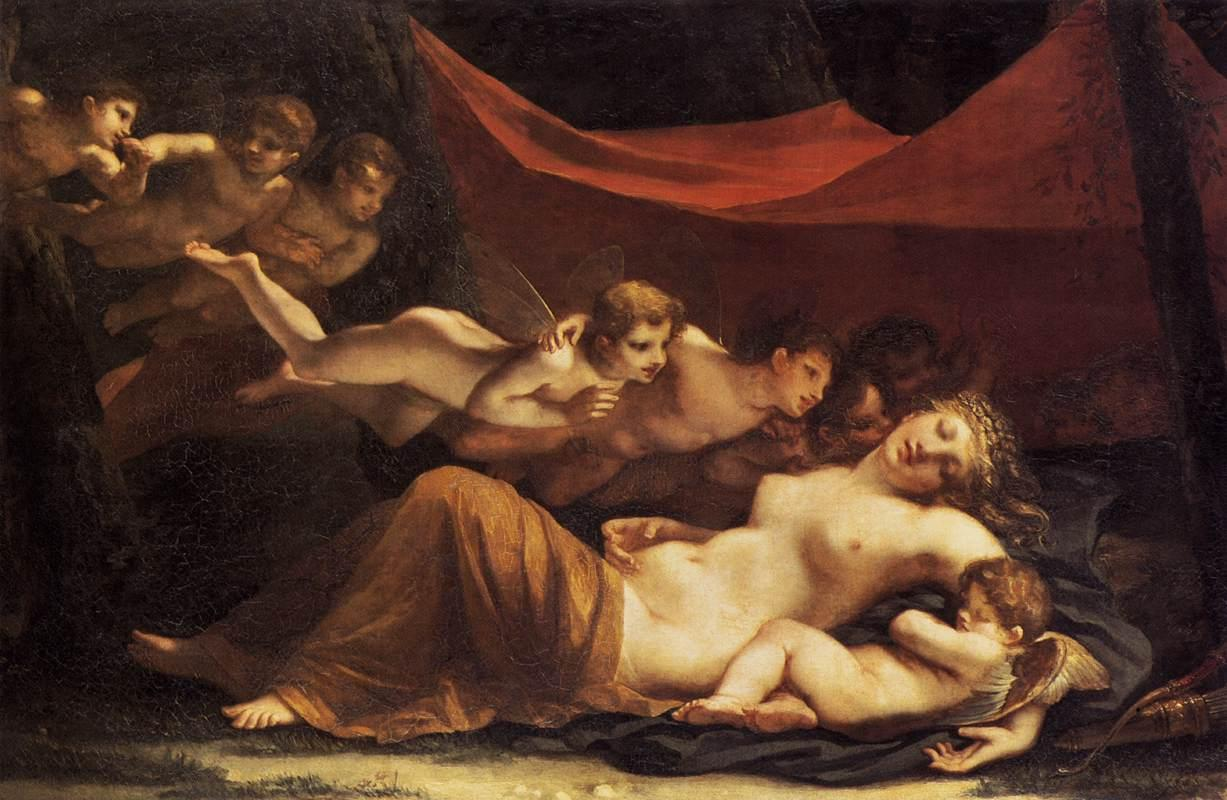
The Sleep of Venus and Cupid by Constance Mayer

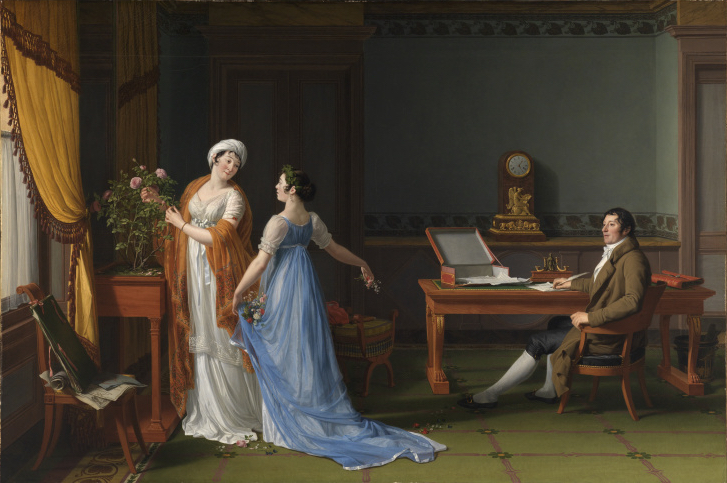
Le Comte de La Forest with His Wife and Daughter by François-André Vincent

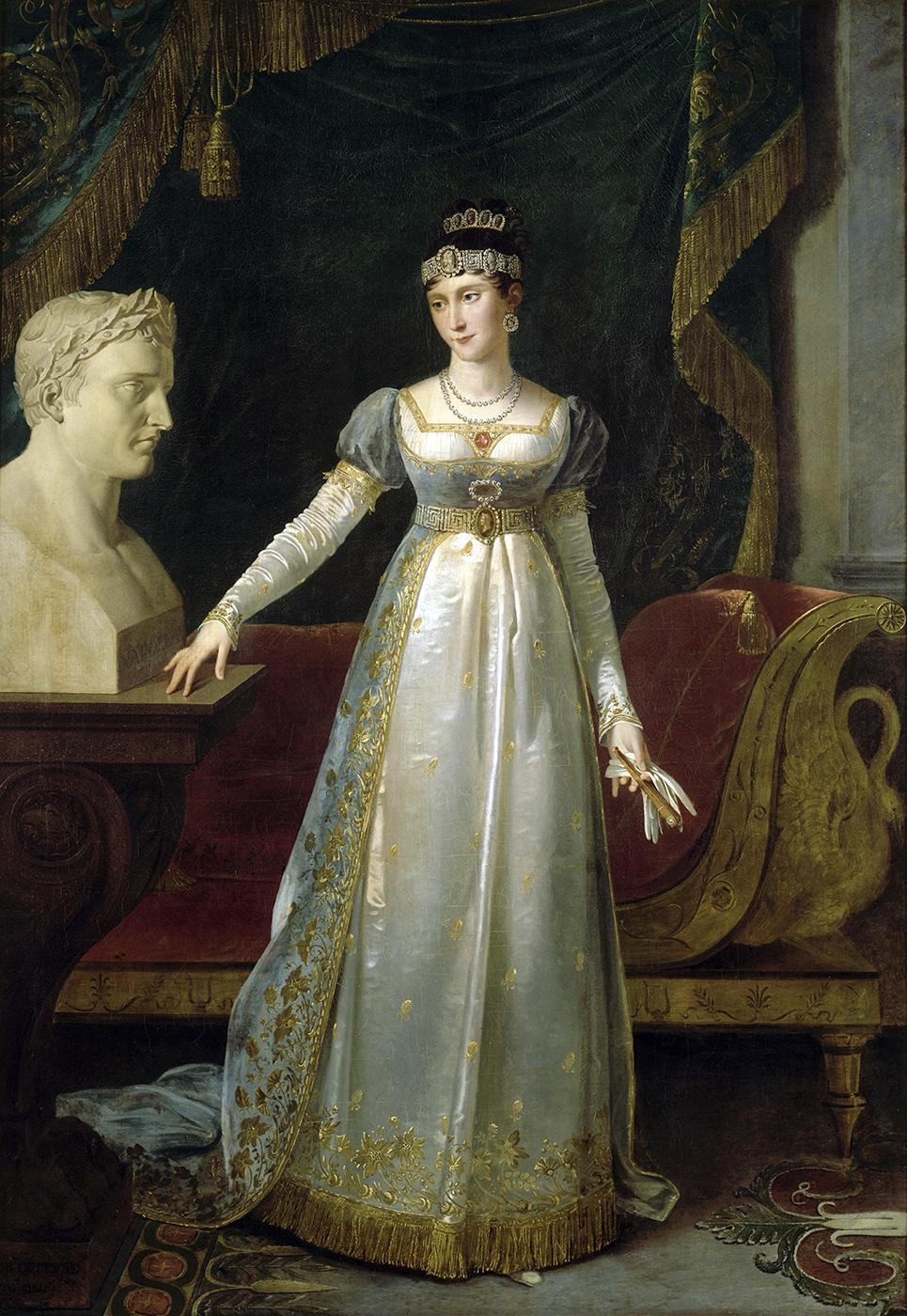
Portrait of Pauline Bonaparte by Robert Lefèvre

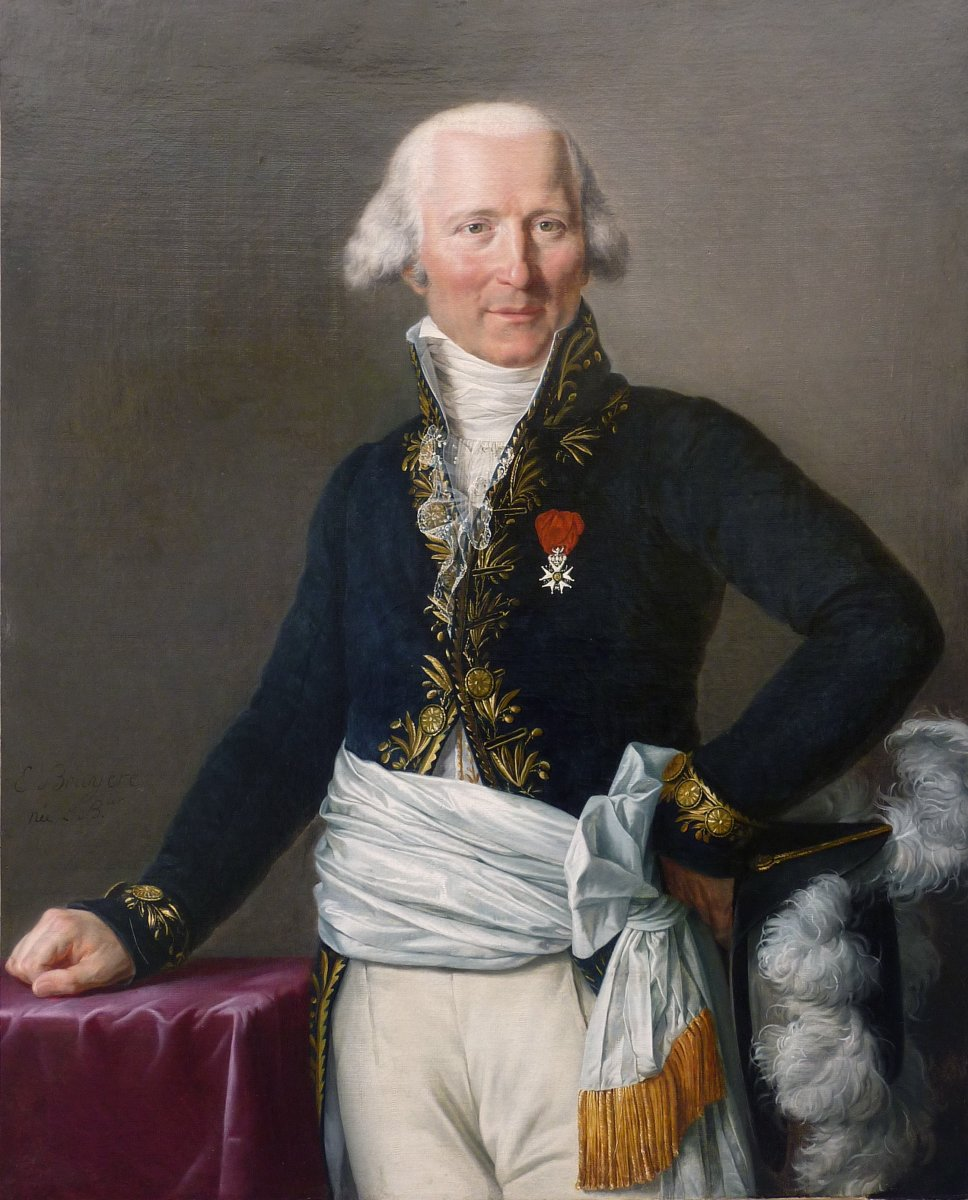
Portrait of Joseph Léopold Saget by Élise Bruyère

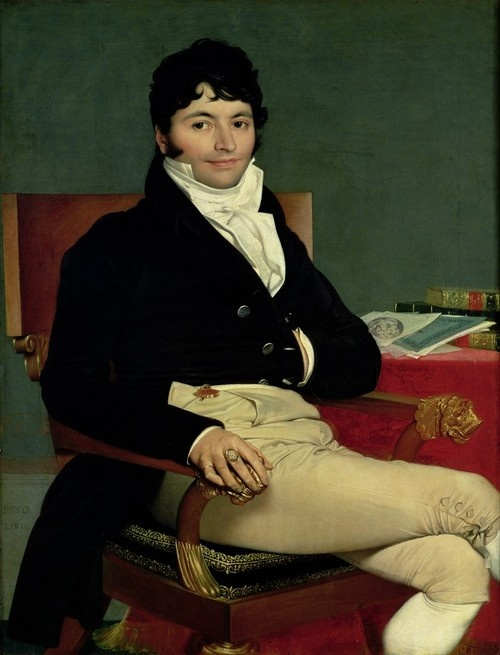
Portrait of Philibert Rivière by Jean-Auguste-Dominique Ingres

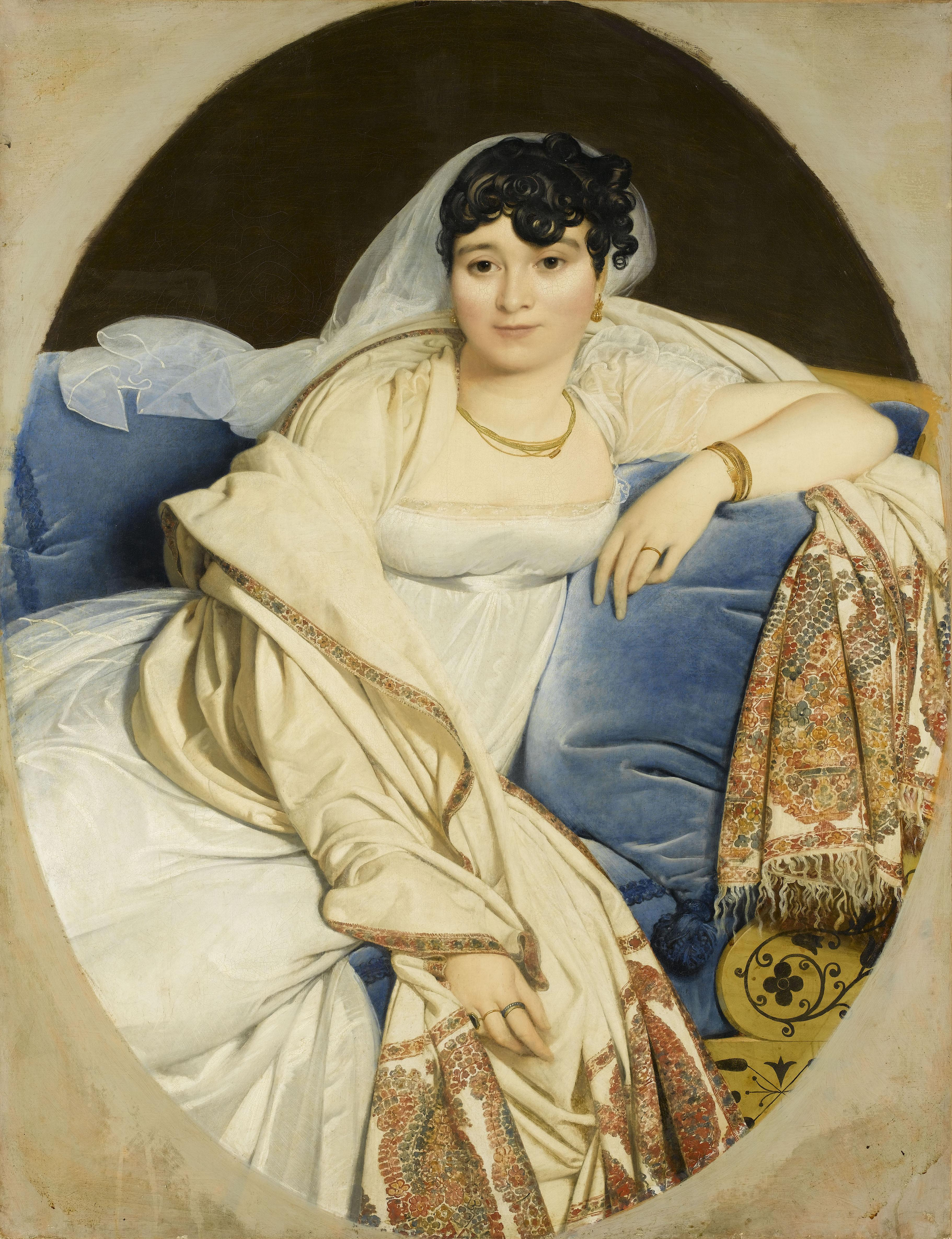
Portrait of Marie-Françoise Rivière by Jean-Auguste-Dominique Ingres

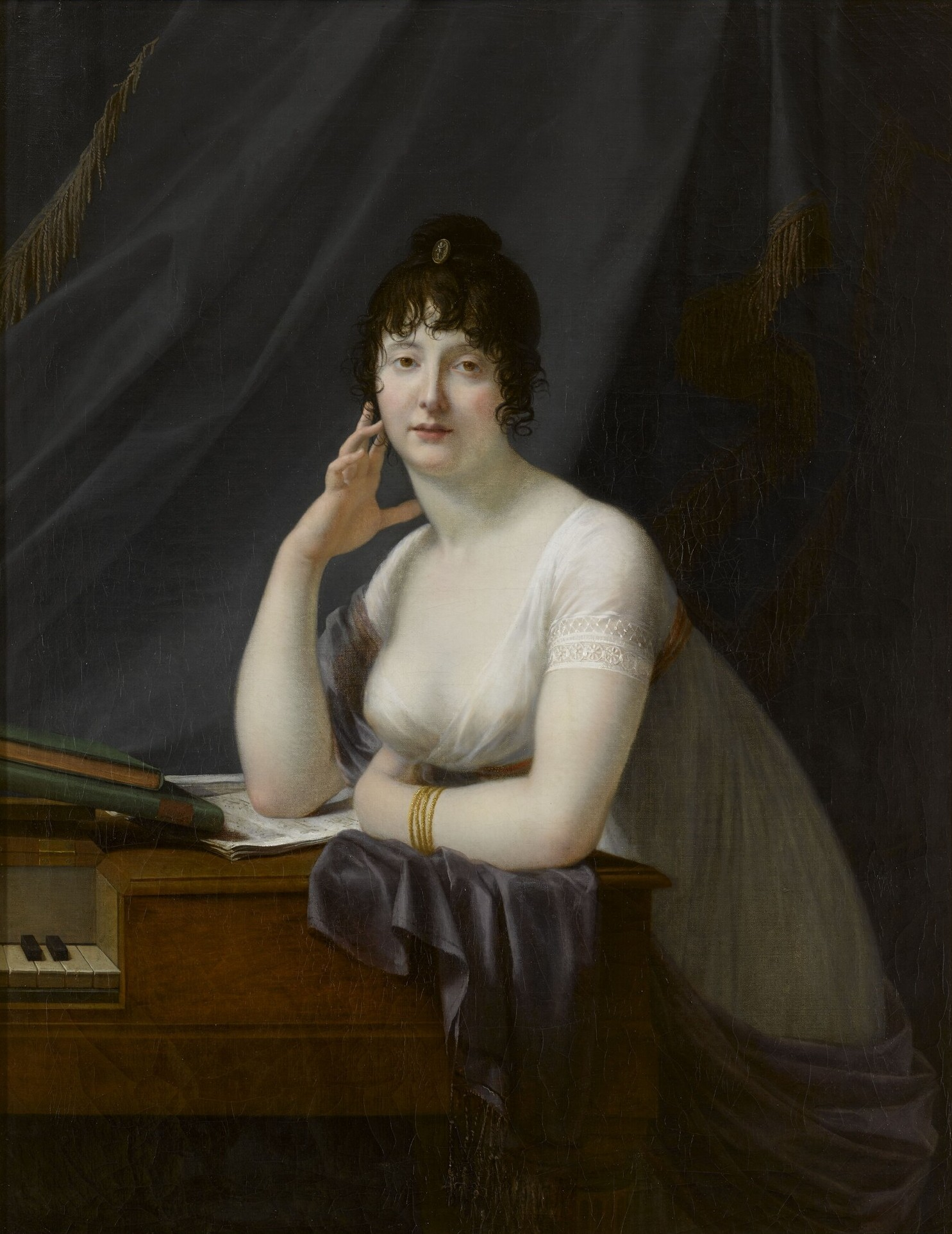
Portrait of Madame Arnault by Eugénie Servières

== Bibliography ==
- Germani, Ian. Dying for France: Experiencing and Representing the Soldier’s Death, 1500–2000. McGill-Queen's Press, 2023.
- Porterfield, Todd & Siegfried, Susan L. Staging Empire: Napoleon, Ingres, and David. Pennsylvania State University, 2006.
- Rifkin, Adrian. Ingres Then, and Now. Routledge, 2005.
- Siegel, Jonah. Material Inspirations: The Interests of the Art Object in the Nineteenth Century and After. Oxford University Press, 2020.

== See also ==
- Category:Artworks exhibited at the Salon of 1806
