= Scene from a Deluge =

Painting by Anne-Louis Girodet

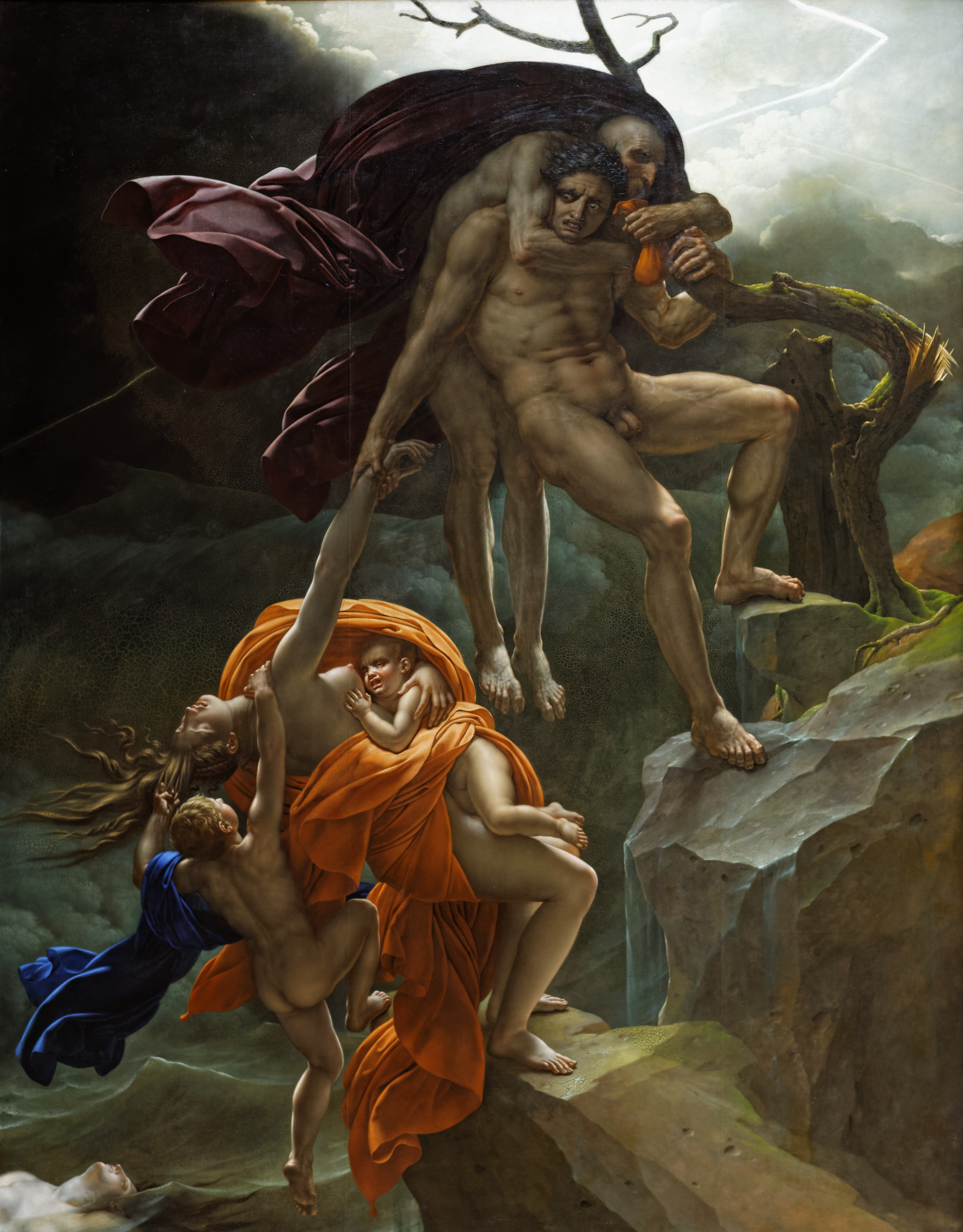
- Artist: Anne-Louis Girodet de Roussy-Trioson
- Year: c. 1806
- Medium: Oil on canvas
- Dimensions: 441 cm × 341 cm (174 in × 134 in)
- Location: Louvre, Paris

Scene from a Deluge (Scène du déluge) is an oil-on-canvas painting by Anne-Louis Girodet. It was first exhibited at the Salon of 1806 and is now in the collection of the Louvre, in Paris.

== Background ==
Anne Louis-Girodet began studying under Neoclassical French painter Jacques-Louis David at the age of seventeen. His first painting under David’s atelier, The Death of Camila, was indicative of his Davidian training. The piece contained many traditional neoclassical features such as sharply defined lines, subdued colors, and axial symmetry. In his subsequent works, Girodet began to employ his own unique aesthetic, shifting more towards a style now known as Romanticism. In particular, Girodet’s use of melodrama and the supernatural in pieces such as Nebuchadnezzar Orders the Execution of the Sons of Zedekiah, The Assassination of Tatius, and King of the Sabines differed greatly from the traditional, non-imaginative style of David and other neoclassical artists of this time. These distinct features are especially present in Deluge, and propelled Girodet into the spotlight as a frontrunner in Romantic art.

After his painting, Ossian Receiving the Ghosts of French Heroes was widely criticized at the Salon of 1802, Girodet was resolute about triumph at a future Salon. Scene From a Deluge provided much of the success that he sought, despite being initially met with a mixed reception at the Salon of 1806.

== Description ==
The large-format canvas (4.41 x 3.41 meters) represents five members of the same family; they struggle to escape the raging elements of nature. The man perched on a rock hangs from a tree that is beginning to break; he tries to pull up his wife and two children, all while supporting on his back an old man who carries a purse in his hand. The sky is streaked with lightning; a cadaver floats in the agitated water.

The frightful scene has elements of the Sublime, which Girodet deployed to engage viewers. The man’s expression of terror amplifies the effect. The work thrilled, excited, and terrified the audience at the Salon.

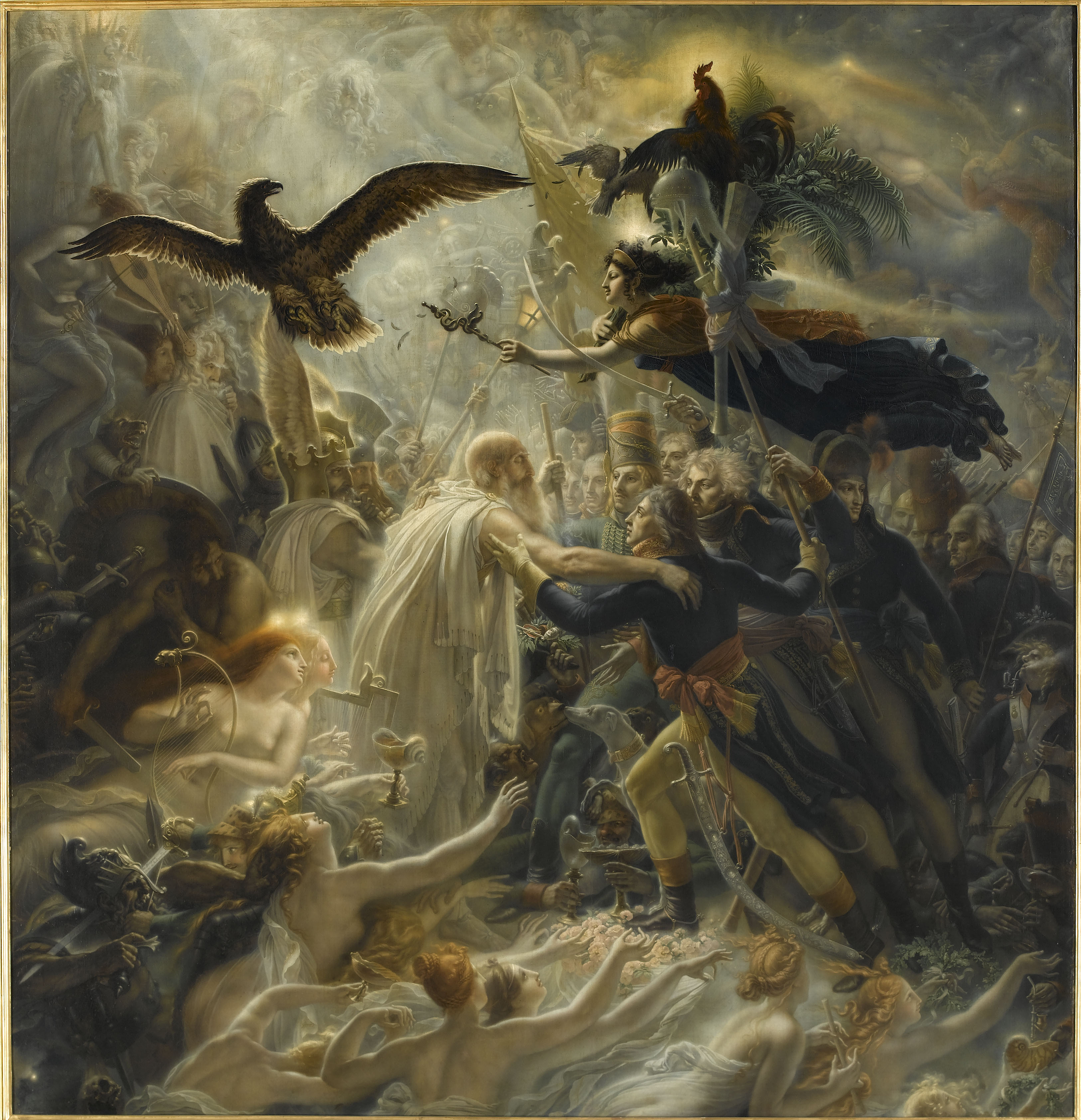
Anne-Louis Girodet de Roussy-Trioson Ossian Receiving the Ghosts of French Heroes c. 1802

== Analysis ==
Initial Confusion with the Biblical Flood

Despite frequent comparisons to Nicolas Poussin's Le Déluge, Girodet denied any relationship to the piece, and insisted that the painting was not a depiction of the biblical flood. In an article for the Journal de Paris, Girodet revealed that the title of the work was misprinted in the Salon catalog as “Une Scene du Deluge” rather than “Une Scene de Deluge.” Initially, critics complained that the painting lacked the “panoramic vastness” typically associated with the biblical flood. Attributing the confusion to the mistaken title, Girodet emphasized that he merely wished to illustrate ‘a sudden and partial inundation produced by a convulsion of nature’.

Meaning

According to the 2005 exhibition on Girodet organized by Sylvain Bellenger, the painting can be interpreted as a political allegory. In September 1806, Girodet wrote about his painting for the Journal de Paris: "How many people, set upon the reefs of the world and in the midst of social tempests, entrust, like this family, their health and fortune to rotten supports." The “social tempest” was likely an allusion to the Revolution and “rotten supports” a possible reference to Napoleon. In January of 1793, Girodet himself was victim to a violent attack by the French Revolutionary Army, in which he barely escaped with his life. Though Girodet never pointed to this directly as the inspiration for this piece, it is likely that this experience heavily shaped his worldview. His comments for the Journal de Paris suggest a view of the painting in which France clings desperately to Napoleon to escape from the violent revolutions only to discover that Napoleon, the support, was rotten enough to plunge France back into the same turmoil. The breaking tree intends to represent the fragility of these supports. The figures, seeking physical rather than spiritual, salvation have fallen victim to this flood due to these circumstances.

== Response from critics ==
From the first day of exhibition, the crowds were captivated by the piece. One observer wrote in the Gazette de France, “Today, at the opening of the Salon, all eyes were drawn to a scene of the Flood [sic] by Girodet. This fine composition was widely admired.” Another, for the Journal de l'Empire, wrote “We were waiting with something like impatience for Mr. Girodet to produce a work that would leave the harshest connoisseurs in no doubt as to the assurance and supremacy of his talent.” But critics did not entirely approve of its unorthodox subject matter and visual qualities. David, Girodet’s mentor, particularly passed severe judgment on the painting and declared it a threat to the dignity of art. He believed that it threatened the idealism of art and, if it was not checked, it would lead to a distasteful genre of history painting less focused on the subject matter and more on melodrama and perversity. Many critics found the work unnecessarily horrific. Some felt that Girodet had gone too far and believed that viewers were overwhelmed rather than moved by grief when seeing the painting. Girodet's defenders claimed that the painting had a philosophical lesson: an allegory depicting man protecting age, womanhood, and youth. Aside from the subject matter, critics complained about a variety of stylistic elements of the painting. The anatomy of the figures was too idealized and just used to draw the viewer in. But the mother's upper arm is too limp compared to her sturdy legs and the cadaver floating in the water was too pretty, and the dimensions and balance were lacking, possibly due to the largeness of the painting. Girodet was hurt by the criticisms despite the praise he received, and he responded to critics in an anonymous text titled "La Critique des Critiques du Sallon [sic] de 1806." The text suggested that critics tend to deny a living painter's accomplishments but when the painter is dead, his reputation rises automatically.

== Recognition and display ==
The painting received first prize at the concours décennal of 1810, under the category of heroic history painting, beating Jacques-Louis David's Sabine Women; it was again exhibited at the Salon of 1814. It was purchased by the French state in 1818 for the Musée du Luxembourg in Paris. Upon Girodet's death in 1824, it was transferred to the Louvre, along with two other works by the artist: The Sleep of Endymion and the Burial of Atala.

The painting is regarded today as one of Girodet’s greatest works.

== Related works ==
A preparatory drawing in black chalk, dated ca. 1795, is held by the National Gallery of Canada. This sketch illustrates his interest in this particular scene composition long before the painting was started between 1802 and 1806. According to the National Gallery of Canada, the initial sketch differs from the final piece in a few key ways: “Still horizontal rather than vertical, this early version does not comprise the tree nor the older child clinging to his mother’s neck in the painting. Instead, a dog accompanies the group and the drapery effects are less dramatic." The presence of lightning in both the initial sketch and completed work highlights Girodet’s commitment to alternative forms of illumination.

The painting was reproduced as a lithograph in 1825 by Jean Baptiste Aubry-Lecomte.

== Bibliography ==
- Dale G. Cleaver (1978). "Girodet's Déluge, a Case Study in Art Criticism". Art Journal. 38 (2): 96–101. doi:10.1080/00043249.1979.10793479.
- Chiara Savettieri (2017). 'Tutto è disperazione in questo dipinto' : interpretazione del Déluge di Anne-Louis Girodet. Philosophica (in Italian). Pise: Edizioni ETS. p. 166. ISBN 978-88-467-4928-4..
- Bellenger, Sylvian (2005) Girodet 1767–1824 Musee du Louvre, Reunion des musees nationaux, Art institute. Paris: Gallimard Musee du Louvre ed. ISBN 2-35031-038-8
- Beaulieu, Brooks. “Girodet (1767–1824).” Nineteenth-Century Art Worldwide, Spring 1, 2006. https://www.19thc-artworldwide.org/spring06/girodet-1767-1824.
- Gersh-Nesic, Beth. “Neoclassicism, an Introduction .” Khan Academy, 2015. https://pl.khanacademy.org/humanities/renaissance-reformation/rococo-neoclassicism/neo-classicism/a/neoclassicism-an-introduction.
- Kuspit, Donald. “Girodet’s Sensationalism.” artnet, May 5, 2006. http://www.artnet.com/magazineus/features/kuspit/kuspit8-16-06.asp.
- O’Rourke, Stephanie. “Girodet’s Galvanized Bodies.” Wiley, November 27, 2018. https://onlinelibrary.wiley.com/doi/10.1111/1467-8365.12401.
- Sonia, Del Re. “Expressive and Refined: Study for ‘a Flood Scene’ by Anne-Louis Girodet | National Gallery of Canada.” National Gallery of Canada, April 24, 2018. https://www.gallery.ca/magazine/your-collection/at-the-ngc/expressive-and-refined-study-for-a-flood-scene-by-anne-louis.
