= The Death of General Desaix =

Painting by Jean Broc

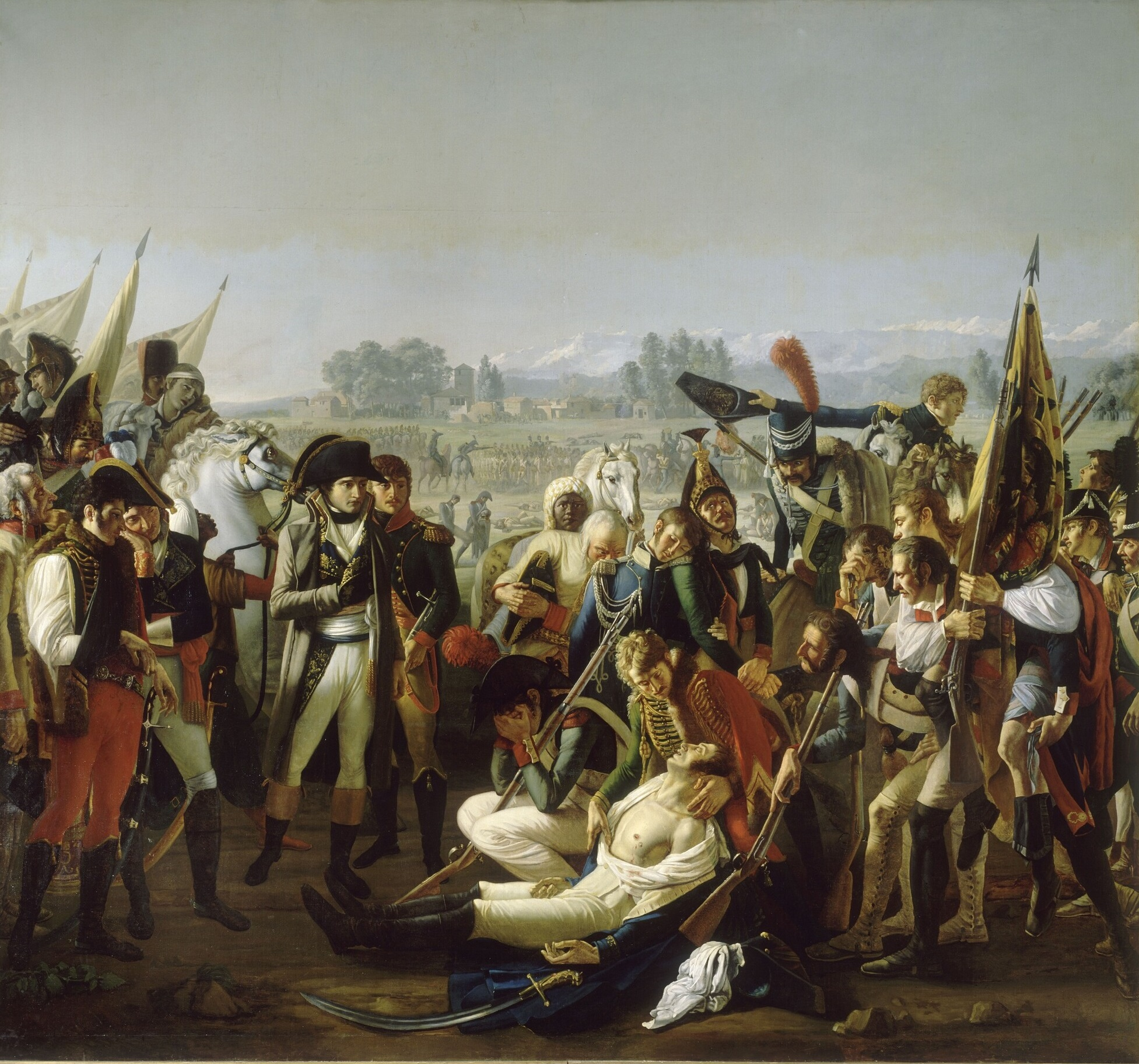
- Artist: Jean Broc
- Year: 1806
- Type: Oil on canvas, history painting
- Dimensions: 322 cm × 450 cm (127 in × 180 in)
- Location: Palace of Versailles, Versailles

The Death of General Desaix (French: Mort du General Desaix) is an oil on canvas history painting by the French artist Jean Broc, from 1806.

It portrays the death of the French general Louis Desaix at the Battle of Marengo on 14 June 1800 during the French Revolutionary Wars. The battle was a notable victory for the French Army of Italy under the command of Napoleon. Desaix was killed in the fighting and Napoleon is shown looking down on his corpse, surrounded by grieving soldiers.

The painting was featured at the Salon of 1806, staged at the Louvre in Paris. By this time Napoleon had become Emperor and encouraged works glorifying his military exploits. Acquired the same yeare by the French state, it is now in the collection of the Musée de l'Histoire de France at the Palace of Versailles.

== Bibliography ==
- Dwyer, Philip. Citizen Emperor: Napoleon in Power. Yale University Press, 2013.
- Germani, Ian. Dying for France: Experiencing and Representing the Soldier’s Death, 1500–2000. McGill-Queen's Press, 2023.
- Hornstein, Katie. Picturing War in France, 1792–1856. Yale University Press, 2018.
