= Elizabeth Harvey (19th-century painter) =

English 19th-century painter

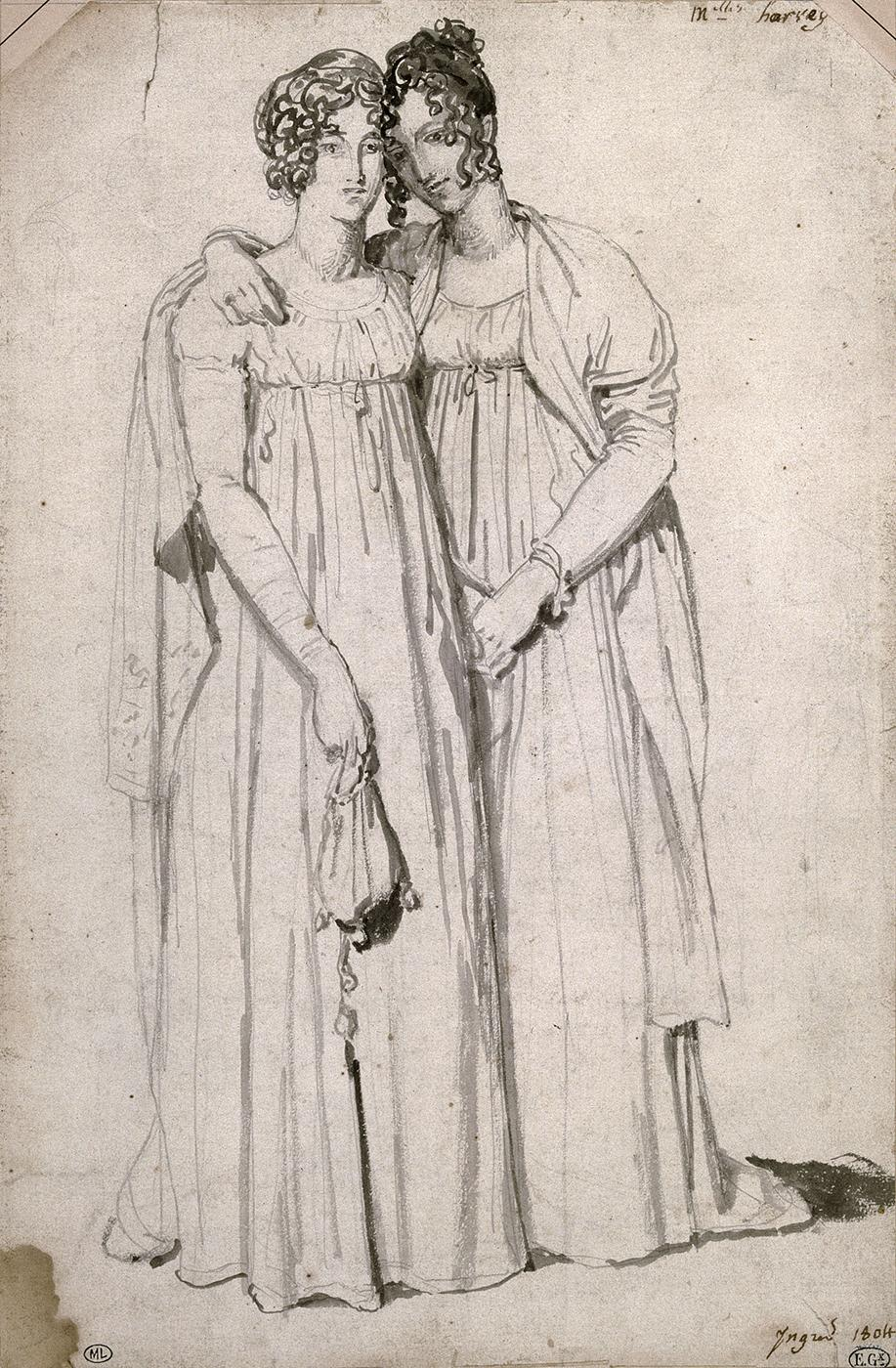
Sketch of Elisabeth Harvey and her half-sister Henrietta by Jean-Auguste-Dominique Ingres in 1806

Elizabeth or Elisabeth Harvey (née Norton, married name de Pulley, 1778 – 12 August 1858) was an English artist known for Malvina Lamenting the Death of Oscar and for portraits of Jacques-Henri Bernardine de Saint-Pierre and his family.

Hans Naef has established that Elisabeth was born out of wedlock to Elizabeth Harvey, née Hill, and William Norton, 2nd Baron Grantley. She studied painting in Italy, where she lived for "five or six years," and then lived in Paris with her mother and elder sister, Henrietta (1774 – 1852).

Under the name Elisabeth Harvey, she exhibited paintings at the Paris Salon between 1802 and 1812, including Malvina Lamenting the Death of Oscar based on a poem by James Macpherson, her Portrait of Bernardin de Saint-Pierre and his family, which survives in a copy by Paul-Michel-Claude Carpentier, and a lost painting titled Edwy and Elgiva, among other portraits.

In 1804, the Harvey sisters were the subject of a sketch by Jean-Auguste-Dominique Ingres. Either Elisabeth or Henrietta was the subject of another Ingres sketch, Miss Harvey Sketching, in 1807. The memoirs of Auguste Barbier indicates that the friendship between Ingres, the Harveys, and the family of Bernardine de Saint-Pierre continued into the 1840s.

The family was described on the occasion of the 1806 Salon: "…a mother whose intelligence, amiability and enlightened taste in literature and the arts are well known, and alongside a sister who has had some success in the same field. The elder Miss Harvey [Henrietta] has acquired a particular skill in painting in sepia on ivory, from classical models or from the best works of the great masters." Henrietta, however, did not exhibit in the Salon.

On 28 January 1818 she married Etienne-Babolin Randon de Pully, and they had a son, William-Enguerran. In 1850 she was living in the Château de Puygirault. She died there in 1858.

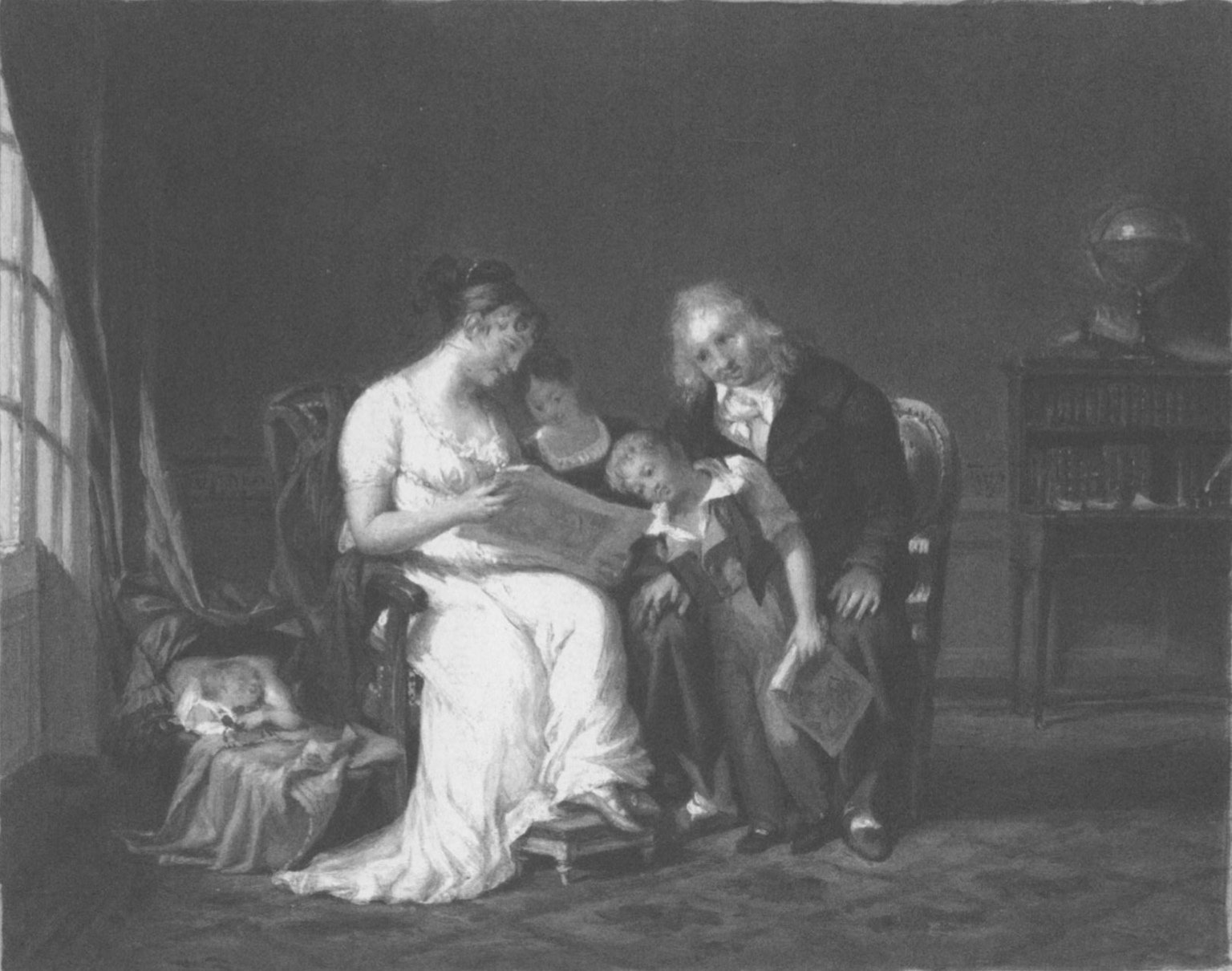
Bernardin de Saint-Pierre and his family (black and white reproduction), 1804 (copy by Paul-Michel-Claude Carpentier after Harvey)

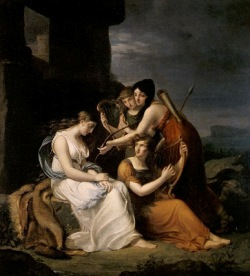
Malvina mourning the death of Oscar, Salon of 1806

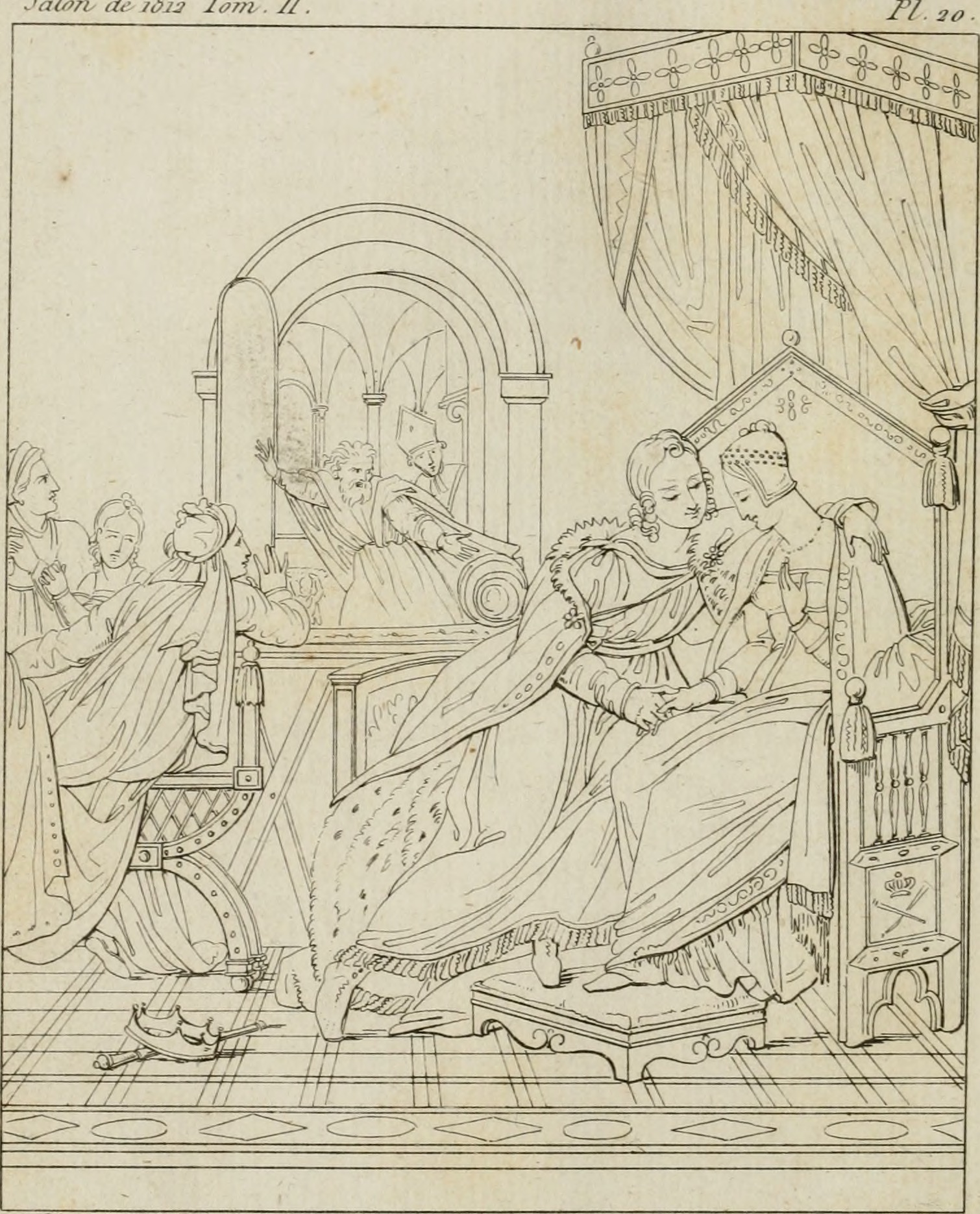
Edwy and Elgiva, Salon of 1812 (engraving from Annales du musée et de l'école moderne des beaux-arts)

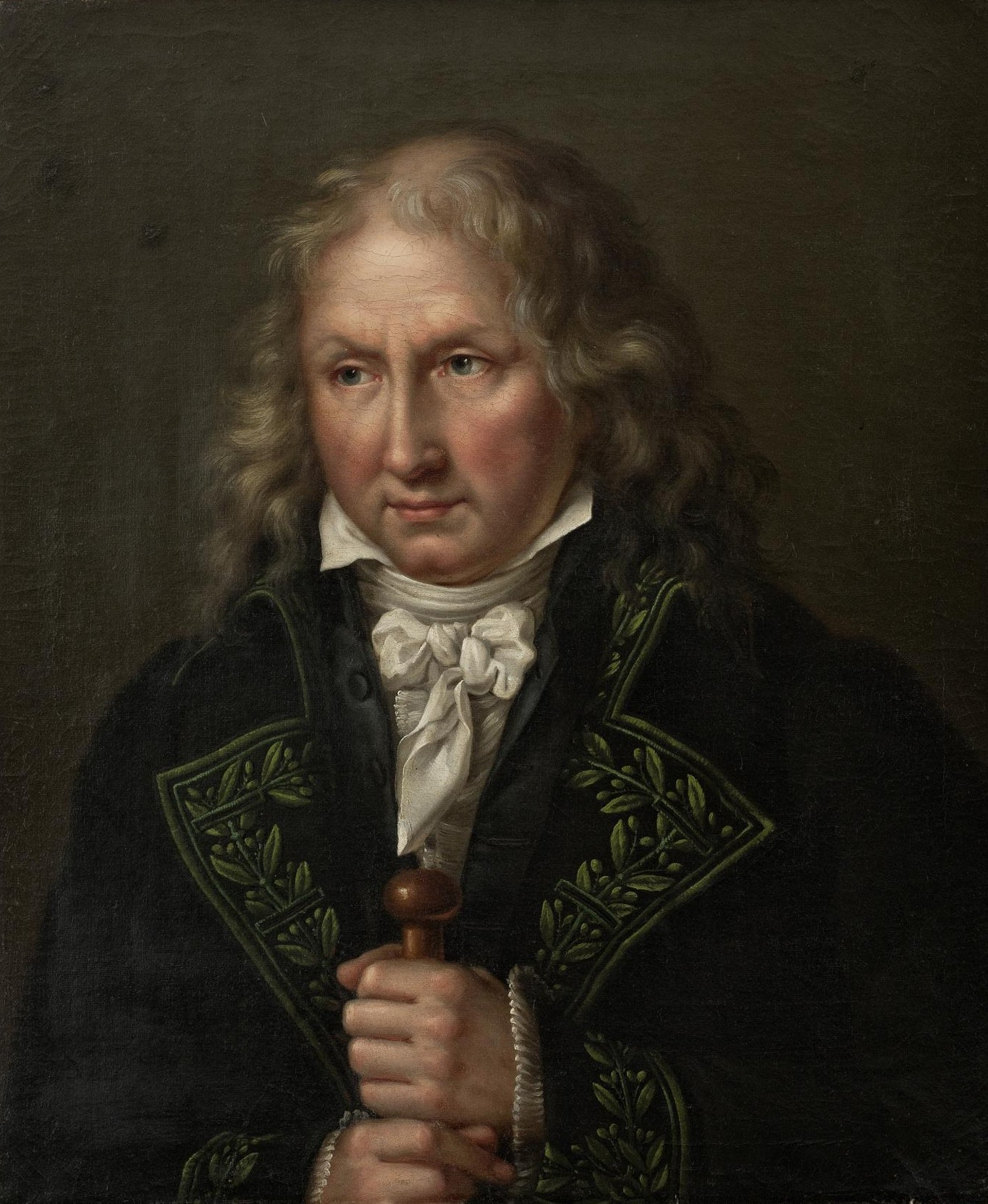
Portrait of Bernardin de Saint-Pierre attributed to Harvey
