= Self-Portrait Aged 24 =

Self-portrait by Jean-Auguste-Dominique Ingres

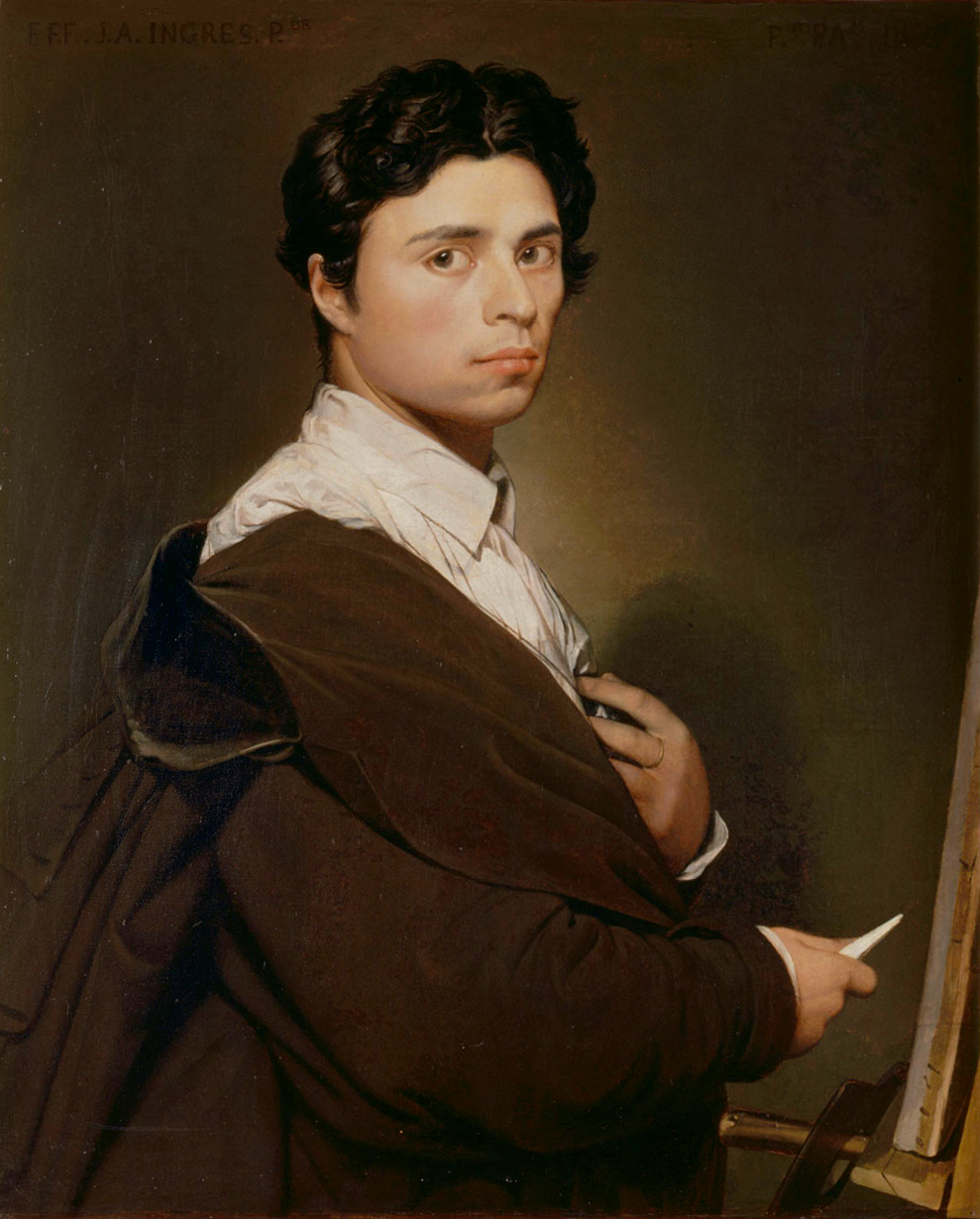
- Artist: Jean-Auguste-Dominque Ingres
- Year: 1804, revised c. 1850/1851
- Medium: Oil on canvas
- Dimensions: 34 in x 27.5 in
- Owner: Musée Condé, Chantilly

Self-Portrait Aged 24 is an oil-on-canvas painting by the French Artist Jean-Auguste-Dominique Ingres, originally produced in 1804. It is Ingres's earliest self-portrait. Ingres later reworked the painting sometime after 1850. In its present form, the painting depicts Ingres standing in front of an easel with a canvas, holding chalk in his right hand, with an oversized brown cloak resting on his upper back. The painting is now in the Musée Condé, Chantilly in France.

== Background ==
Ingres first painted Self-Portrait Aged 24 after he won the Prix de Rome, a high point in his early career. The work marked the beginning of a period when Ingres wanted to distinguish himself as a portraitist. The painting displays many qualities that were typical of Ingres's portraits, including highly defined lines and strong contrasts between dark and light. Like many of his paintings, the first version of the self-portrait received harsh criticism when it was first exhibited.

== Original version ==
The original version of Self-Portrait Aged 24 was exhibited at the 1806 Paris Salon. This painting was met with disheartening remarks from critics, prompting Ingres to declare that he would not exhibit again at the Salon. Elements of the original portrait that have remained the same include Ingres as the main figure, the head turned three quarters to the front, and the right hand holding a piece of chalk.

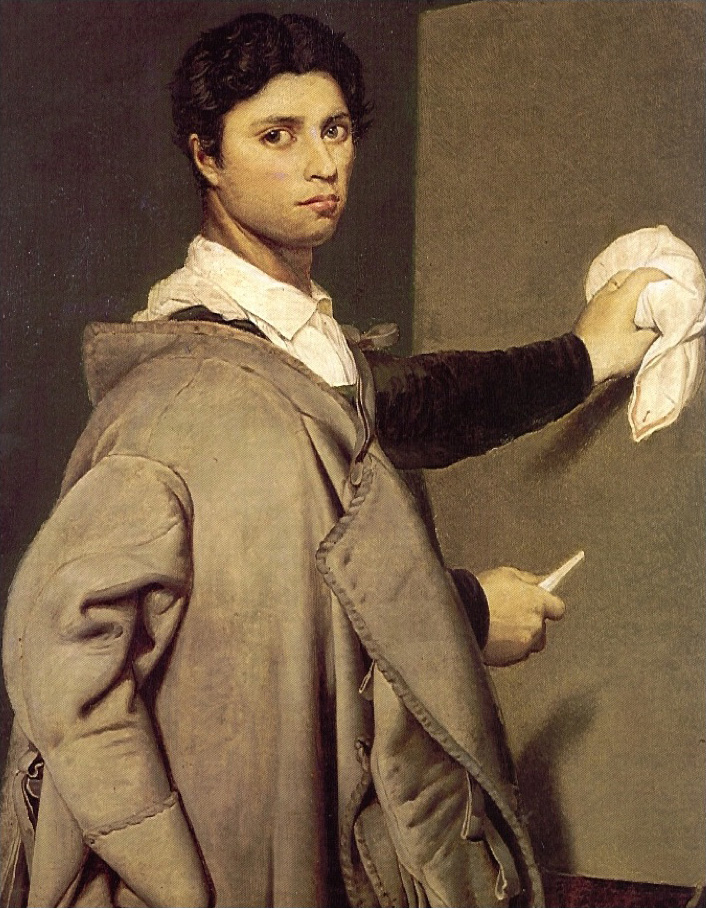
Self-Portrait at the Age of Twenty-Four - Marie-Anne-Julie Forestier, 1807

=== Copies ===
Because Ingres later altered the painting, its original appearance can only be inferred from copies. The first known copy was completed by his fiancé Marie-Anne-Julie Forestier in 1807. In her work, Ingres extends his left hand towards the easel while holding a white handkerchief, embroidered with a red "I" in the corner and faded red detailing. Ingres appears to be erasing an empty canvas with the handkerchief. The coat on Ingres is a heavy, lighter gray colored jacket and shows that Ingres's left arm is not in the left sleeve. The piece of chalk is slightly dulled compared to later versions. His facial features are more serious and his face is thinned out. Ingres has a wedding band on his left middle finger to symbolize his engagement to Forestier.

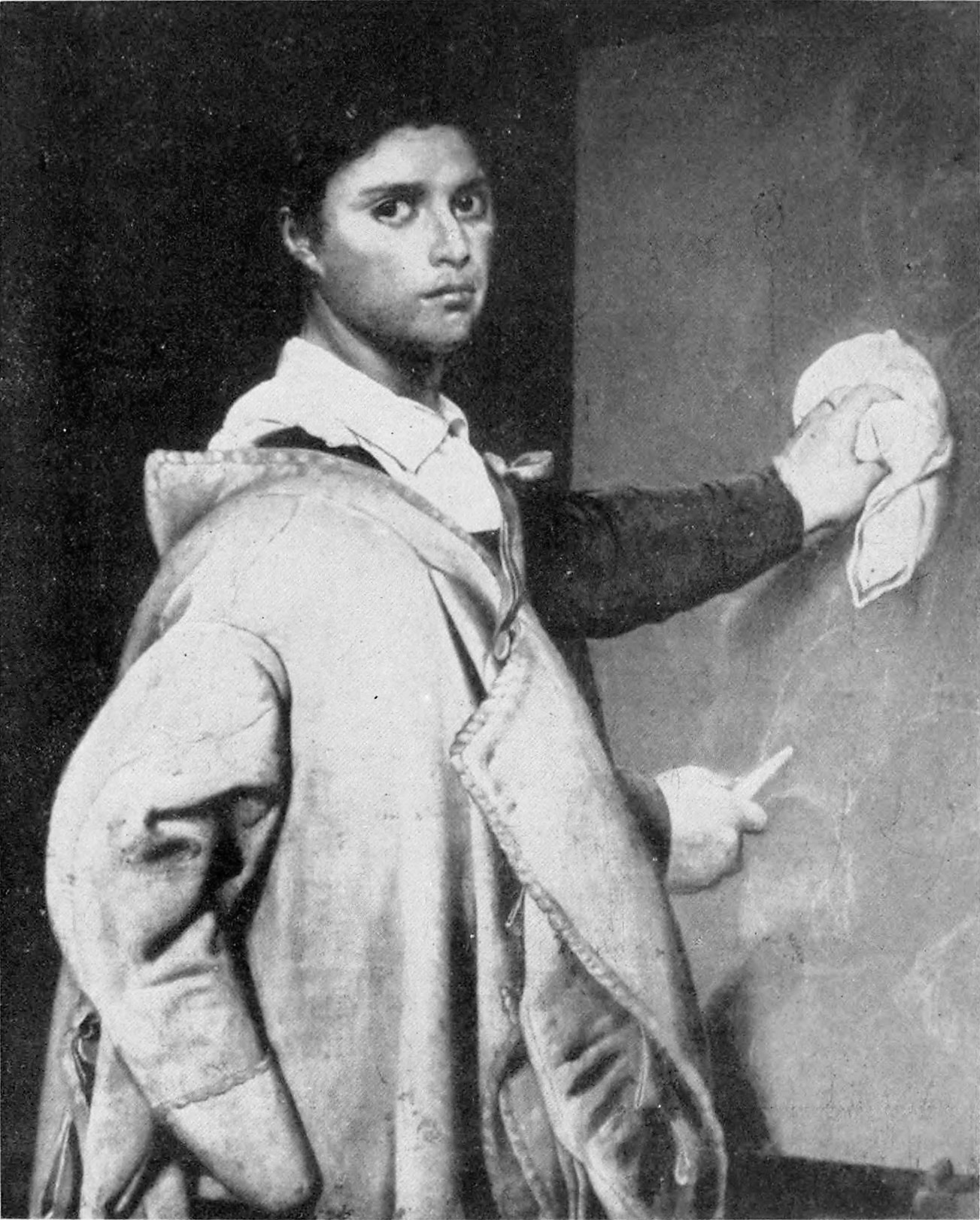
Photograph - Charles Marville, c. 1850/1851

The work is also documented in a photograph by Charles Marville. It was likely taken only months before Ingres began revising the painting, and it was possibly commissioned by the artist himself as a record of the work before he altered it. The photograph differs from Forestier's painting in that it shows the white outlined sketch of François Gilibert, a childhood friend from Montauban, on the canvas. Scholars hypothesize that Ingres added the sketch of Gilibert to his work sometime between the moment when Forestier completed her copy and the time that Marville took his photograph, perhaps responding to critics who disparaged the original work for the blank canvas.

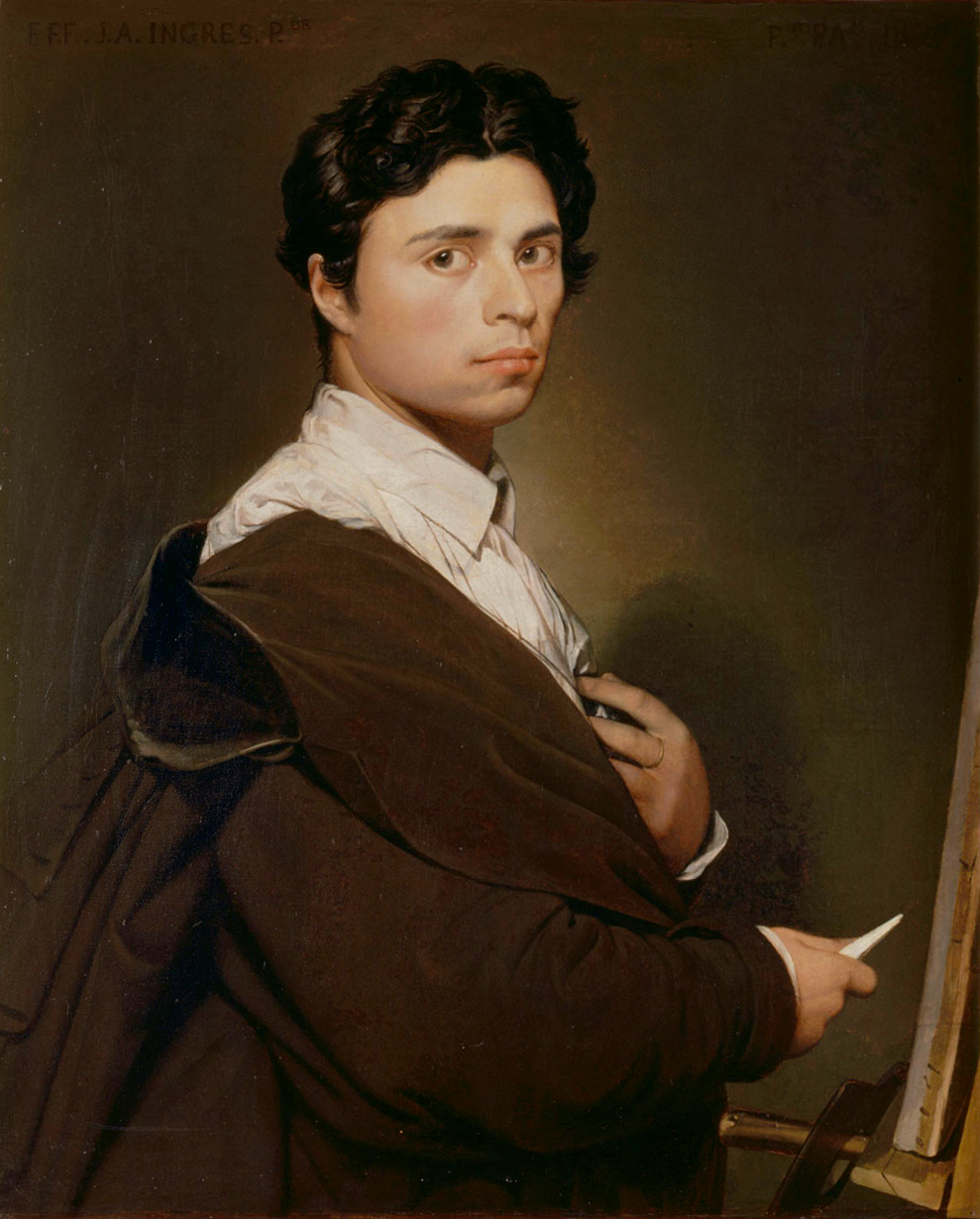
Self-Portrait Aged 24 - Jean-Auguste-Dominique Ingres, 1851

== Altered version ==
After Marville's photograph, Ingres reworked his original version of Self-Portrait Aged 24. Researchers at Centre de recherche et de restauration des musees de France have studied the painting at the Musée Condé, concluding that the original Self-Portrait is underneath this current surface. Given the substantial changes that Ingres made, scholars have sometimes questioned why he did not simply complete a new work. Ingres's left hand is placed on the left side of his chest and the handkerchief has been completely removed. Andrew Carrington Shelton infers that the left hand is clutching an item related to Gilibert, who died around the years of Ingres's final revisions. Additional changes include straightening Ingres's neck and rounding out his facial features. Ingres raised the collar on his neck, and changed the heavy jacket to the brown velvet-collared carrick, an overcoat more similar to a cape.

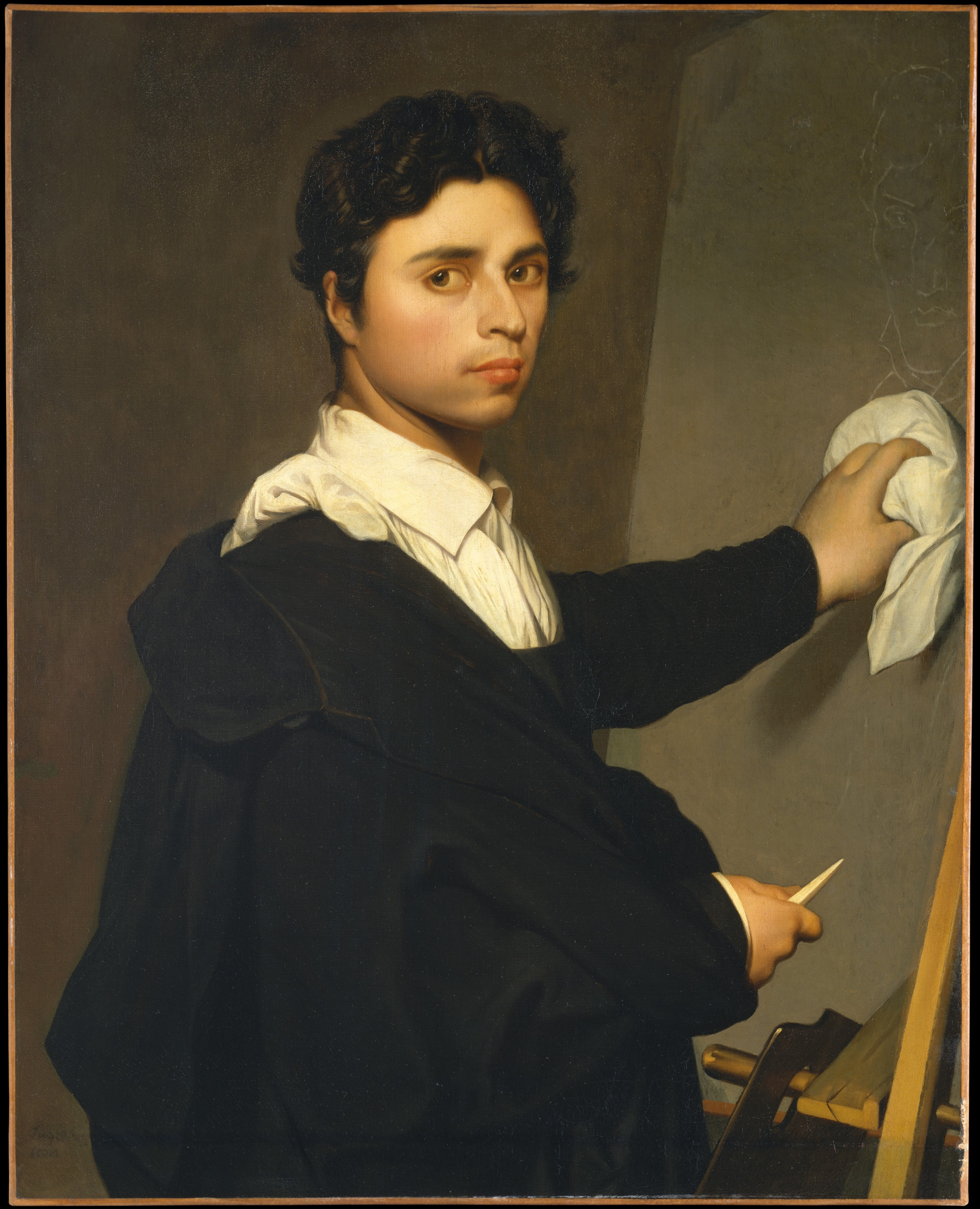
Ingres (1780-1867) as a Young Man - Madame Gustave Héquet, 1861

=== Héquet copy ===
In 1861, Madame Gustave Héquet painted a copy of the work. The copy, now in the Metropolitan Museum of Art, appears similar to the original 1804 version of the work. However, X-Ray analysis has revealed a copy of the later version beneath the surface. It is thought that a later artist altered Héquet's copy to make it conform to Forestier's version, or another copy of the original work.

== Analysis ==
Scholars have analyzed the work in various ways. Andrew Shellington has seen within the painting a potential romantic connection between Ingres and Gilibert. Other scholars have noted the realism of the piece in its treatment of color, light, and texture. The youth in the figure can be seen in the rosacia in his cheeks, and the way that Ingres used defined lines to make the figure pop from the background. Light and shadow adds depth to Ingres's face. Ingres’s brushstrokes create a surface that strongly resembles human flesh. His use of defining lines help to sensualize the body and face. Scholar John Loughery argues that Ingres’s use of "stationary poses is the implicit fact of relentless change."

== Similar works ==
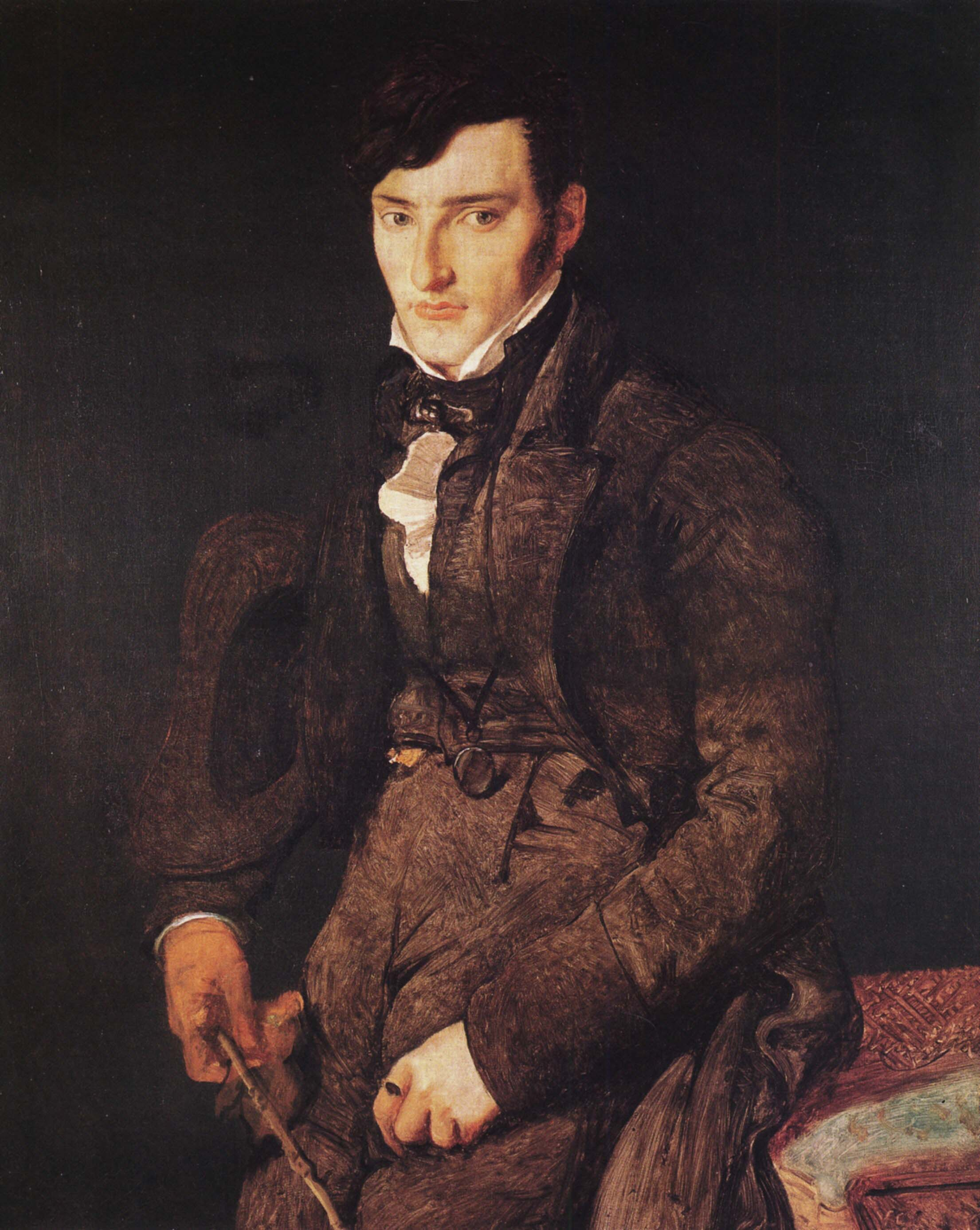
Portrait of Jean-Pierre-Francois GilibertYear 1805Medium Oil on Canvas Dimensions 99 x 81 cmLocation Albi, Musée Toulouse-Lautrec

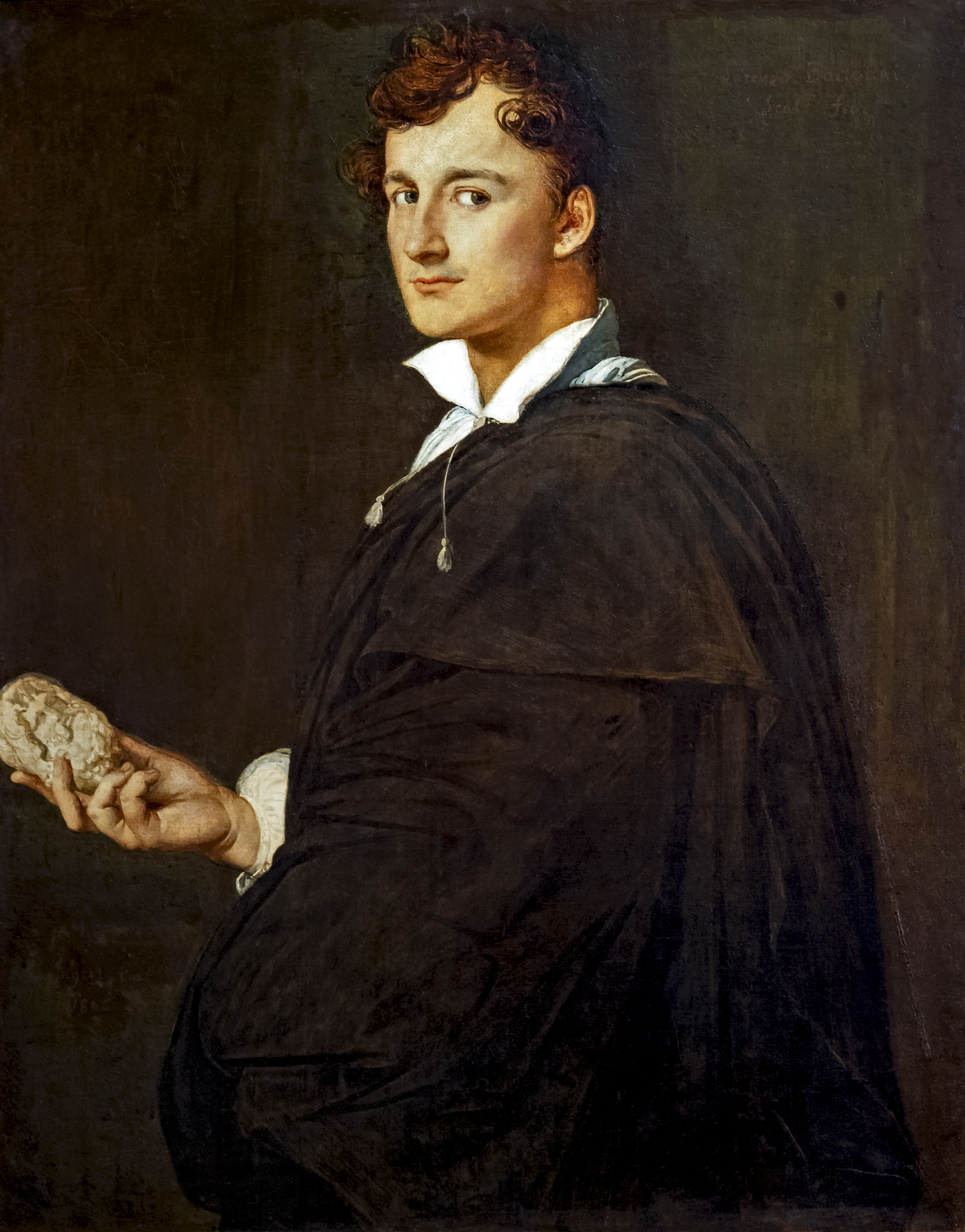
Portrait of BartoliniYear 1806 Medium Oil on Canvas Dimensions 98 cm x 80 cmLocation Musée Ingres, Montauban

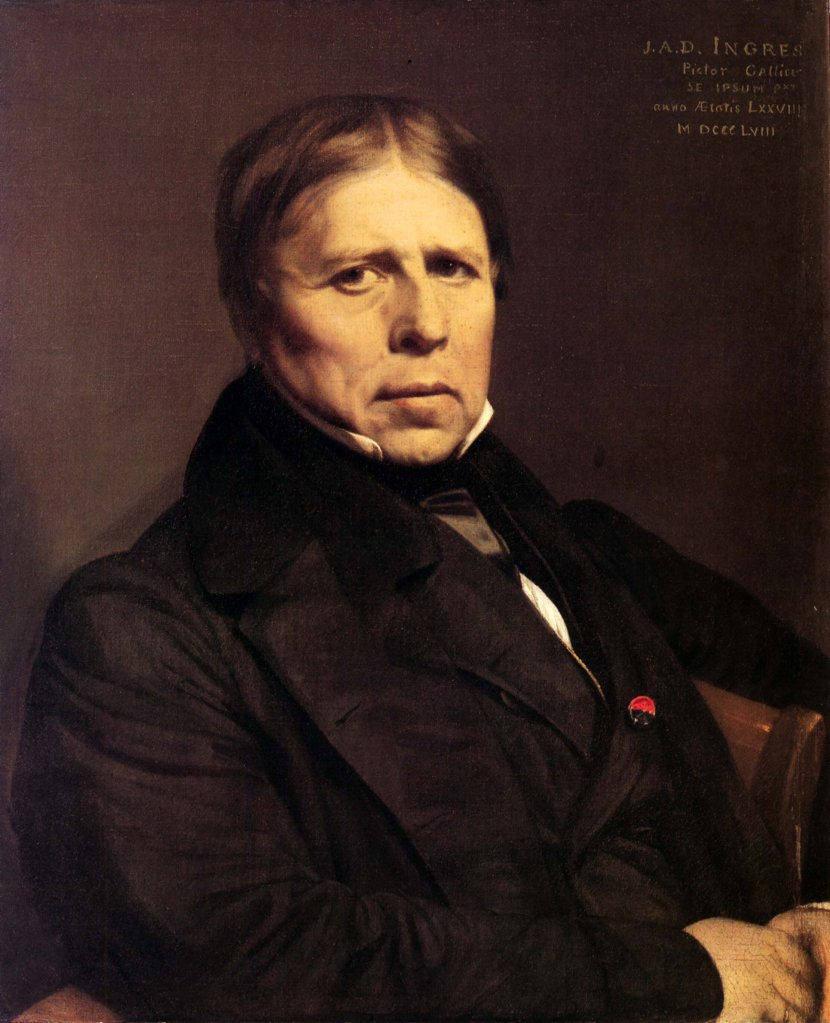
Self-Portrait at Seventy-EightYear 1858Medium Oil on Canvas Dimensions 62 x 51 cmLocation Uffizi Gallery, Florence

== See also ==
- List of paintings by Jean-Auguste-Dominique Ingres
