= Anne Françoise Elisabeth Lange =

French actress (1772–1816)

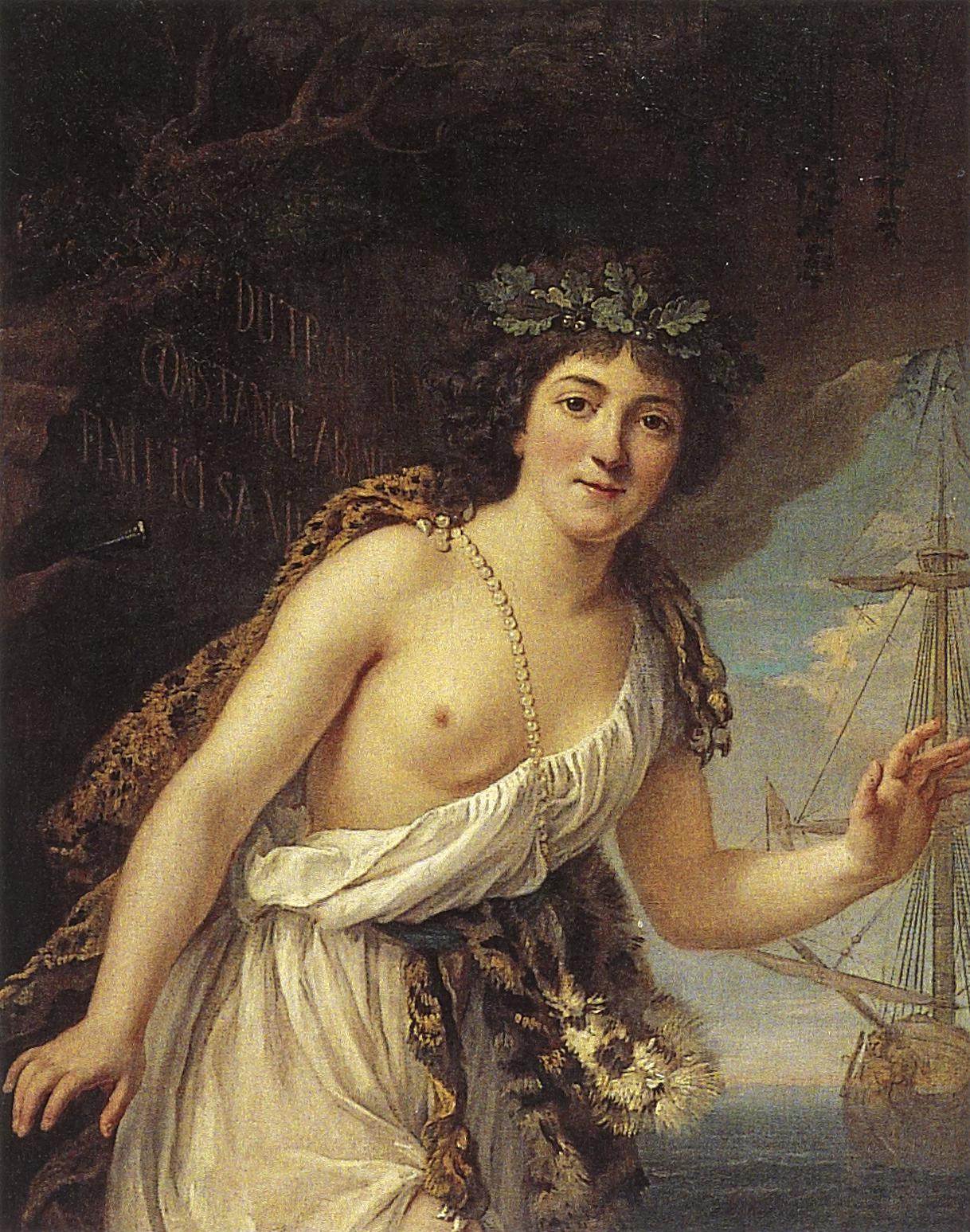
- Mlle Lange as Sylvie by Colson. Exhibited at Salon of 1793.
- Born: 17 September 1772; Genoa, Italy
- Died: 25 May 1816 (aged 43); Florence, Italy
- Other name: Mademoiselle Lange
- Occupations: Actress, merveilleuse
- Partner: Michel-Jean Simons
- Children: Anne-Élisabeth Palmyre (daughter); Son

Anne Françoise Elisabeth Lange (17 September 1772 – 25 May 1825, Florence) was a French actress of the Comédie-Française and a "Merveilleuse" of the French Directory. Her stage name was Mademoiselle Lange.

== Life ==
She was born in Genoa, the daughter of Charles-Antoine Lange (or L'Ange) and Marie-Rose Pitrot, itinerant musicians and actors putting on shows right across Europe. She thus made her stage debut very young in child roles in her parents' companies. In 1776, the family was taken on at the theatre at Liège, and in 1784, they found themselves taken on at the theatre in Ghent. In 1787, Mlle Lange was taken on at the theatre at Tours in Marguerite Brunet's company.

On 2 October 1788, she made her official debut at the Comédie-Française in the role of Lindane in L'Écossaise by Voltaire. She next played Lucinde in L'Oracle by Saint-Foix.

In 1791, the production of the anti-religious and anti-monarchical play Charles IX by Marie-Joseph Chénier divided the company of the Théâtre-Français, with Mlle Lange joining the "patriots" group under Talma, which set itself up at rue de Richelieu (the present home of the Comédie-Française).

However, thinking her talents were not being fully recognized there, she quickly moved to the "aristocrats" faction that had set itself up at the Théâtre du Faubourg Saint-Germain (renamed the Théâtre de la Nation, now known as the Théâtre de l'Odéon).

On 24 February 1793, she played Laure in Le Vieux Célibataire by Jean-François Collin d'Harleville, becoming a sociétaire later that year. She had a triumph in the eponymous role in Paméla ou la Vertu récompensée (Pamela or Virtue Rewarded) by Nicolas-Louis François de Neufchâteau, setting a fashion for straw hats known as "à la Paméla", but the play's royalist overtones led to this theatre being shut down and the author and actors arrested by the Committee of Public Safety.

Mlle Lange was at first imprisoned in the prison de Sainte-Pélagie until, after a few months in captivity, she managed to arrange her transfer to the pension Belhomme (along with her cook, her valet and her lady's maid). There she was able to maintain a large household thanks to funds from the banker Montz, filling the street outside with those coming to visit her. She also bought a hôtel particulier on rue Saint-Georges.

In the wake of a denunciation, Fouquier-Tinville opened an enquiry which led to the arrest of Jacques Belhomme and the closure of the pension Belhomme. Mlle Lange returned to prison, but her friends in high places helped her to evade the guillotine. She was freed after 9th Thermidor and rejoined her fellow actors at the Théâtre Feydeau.

She continued to live the high life under the Directory, having a liaison with the rascally arriviste N. Lieuthraud, the self-proclaimed "marquis de Beauregard", who had made a fortune as supplier to the armies of the republic, but eventually disappeared, pursued by creditors. He housed her at the Hôtel de Salm, one of the houses he had acquired, and maintained her there on an allowance said to be 10,000 livres a day.

She was also the mistress of a rich banker from Hamburg, Hoppé, bearing him a daughter, Anne-Élisabeth Palmyre, who was recognized by her father in 1795. It is improbable, however, that she had an affair with Paul Barras as is claimed in the libretto of the famous operetta by Charles Lecocq, La Fille de madame Angot, in which Mlle Lange appears in a secondary role. Her final lover was Michel-Jean Simons, a Belgian supplier to the French army, with whom she had a son in December 1797. In 1798, Simons' father married her friend Julie Candeille. Simons recognized their son and married Mlle Lange, making her Madame Simons and putting an end to her theatrical career; she reappeared only for a few performances in 1807. Michel-Jean Simons went bankrupt trying to pay down a business debt to the French government and moved to Brussels in 1810. Mlle Lange (Madame Simons) wisely separated her money from her husband's and bought a chateau in Bossey, near Lake Leman. She also spent time in Florence. Mlle Lange died in 1825 and her husband died in 1833.

== Portraits ==
Mlle. Lange sat for a number of artists, including two French artists of the Paris Salon. Sylvie by Jean-François Gilles Colson was featured at the Salon of 1793. A contemporary of the artist, Girodet-Trioson created Le Sommeil d'Endymion for the same event.

A few years later, Girodet would depict Mademoiselle Lange as Venus at the Salon of 1799. The sitter expressed her disapproval of the work in a written letter. The artist would then replace the Venus with Portrait of Mlle. Lange as Danae in what became a major scandal in art.

Robert Lefèvre did a portrait of her as Mme Simons, née Lange, as well as a portrait of her husband, Michel-Jean Simons.

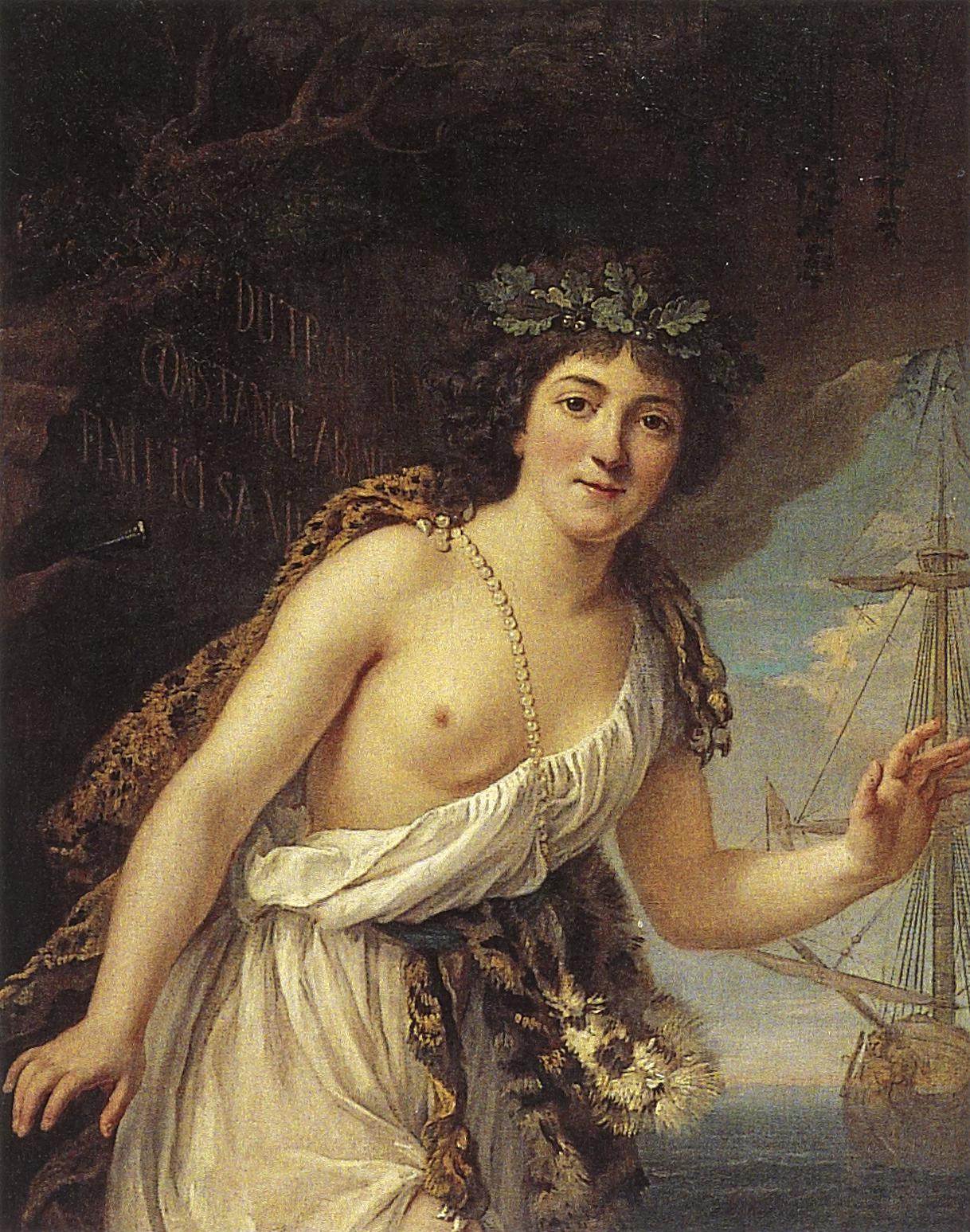
Sylvie by Colson (1792)

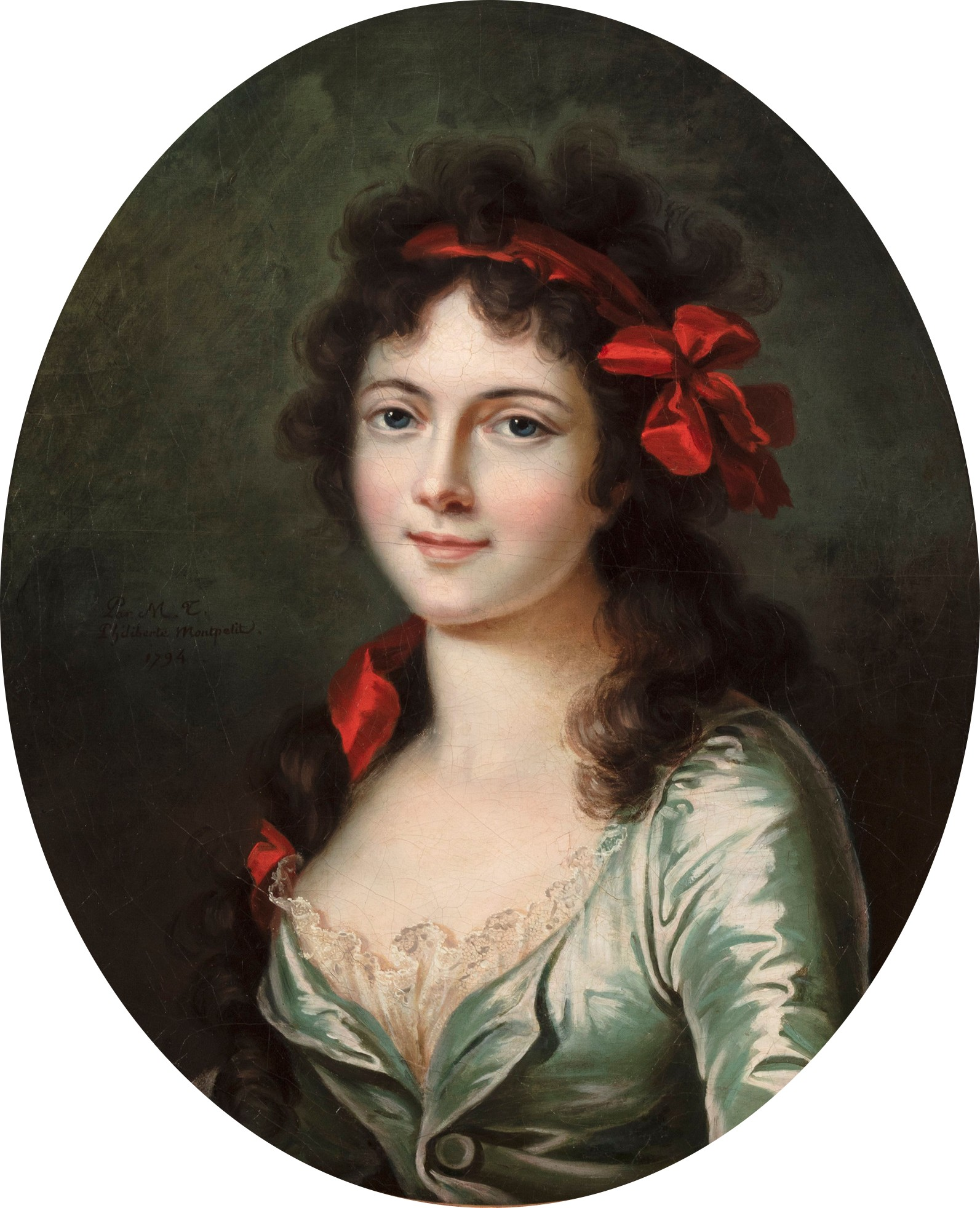
Mademoiselle Lange by Thérèse Vincent de Montpetit (1794)

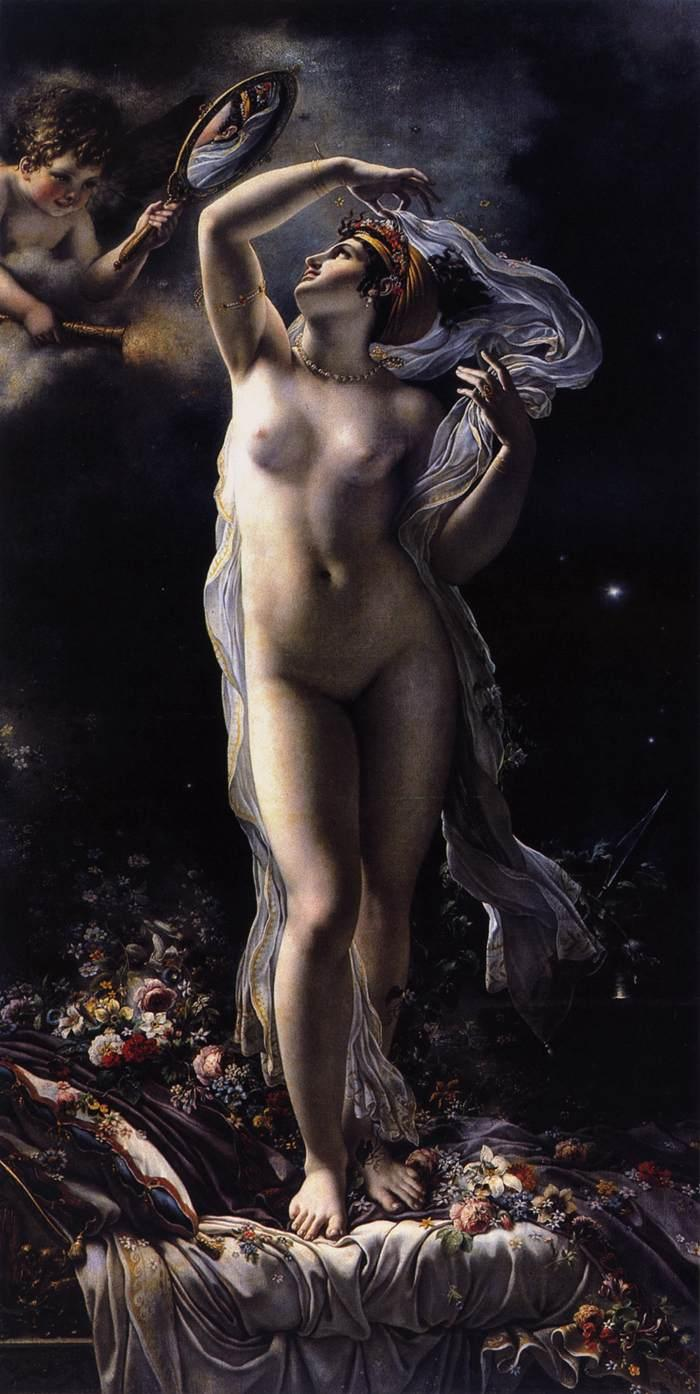
Mademoiselle Lange as Venus by Girodet (1798)

Danae by Girodet (1799)

== See also ==
- Troupe of the Comédie-Française in 1790

== Sources ==
- J. Vincent, La belle Mademoiselle Lange (Elisabeth Simons-Lange, 1772 – c. 1825). Paris: Hachette, 1932
- Chisholm, Hugh, ed. (1911). "Lange, Anne Françoise Elizabeth" . Encyclopædia Britannica. Vol. 16 (11th ed.). Cambridge University Press. p. 172.
