= Belhomme =

Belhomme is a French surname meaning "handsome man". Notable people with the surname include:

- Albert Belhomme de Franqueville (1814–1891), French botanist and mountain climber
- Gaston Belhomme (1848–1931), French politician
- Guillaume Belhomme (born 1976), French writer and musician
- Humbert Belhomme (1653–1727), Benedictine abbot and writer from Lorraine
- Hippolyte Belhomme, (1854–1923), French opera singer
- Jacques Belhomme (1737–1824), owner of the Pension Belhomme
- Jacques-Étienne Belhomme (1800–1880), French psychiatrist, son of Jacques Belhomme
- Jeanne Belhomme, French actress and theatre director
- Marie Belhomme (born 1978), French film director

== See also ==
- La Bête à Maît' Belhomme, 1885 short story by Guy de Maupassant
- Pension Belhomme, prison and private clinic during the French Revolution
- Rue Belhomme, street in the 18th arrondissement of Paris
