= Ferrus =

Ferrus or Ferrús is a surname. Notable people with the name include:

- Diana Ferrus (1953–2026), South African writer, poet and storyteller
- Guillaume Ferrus (1784–1861), French psychiatrist
- José Benetó Ferrús (1919–2006), Valencian politician
- Pero Ferrús, 14th-century Castilian poet
