= Jacques-Étienne Belhomme =

French psychiatrist

Jacques-Étienne Belhomme (29 January 1800 – 16 February 1880) was a French psychiatrist who was a native of Paris. He was the son of carpenter Jacques Belhomme (1737–1824), who managed a maison de santé (Pension Belhomme) for the insane on Rue de Charonne in Paris.

Belhomme studied medicine in Paris, and worked under Jean-Étienne Dominique Esquirol (1772–1840) at the Salpêtrière. His 1824 dissertation, Essai sur l´idiotie was one of the earliest works dedicated to the education of the mentally handicapped. After his father's death in 1824, he inherited the elder Belhomme's maison de santé.

Belhomme was a leading figure in French phrenology, and believed that insanity could be anatomically localized in certain regions of the brain. In 1839 he became secretary of the Société phrénologique. Publications by Belhomme include:

- Considérations sur l'appréciation de la folie, sa localisation et son traitement, 1834.
- Quatrième mémoire sur la localisation des fonctions cérébrales et de la folie, 1845.

== See also ==
- Jean-Baptiste-Maximien Parchappe de Vinay

== Bibliography ==
- Console and Classify, the French Psychiatric Profession by Jan E. Goldstein
- Psicologia - RedePsi PsiPédia (translated biography from Portuguese)
