= Portrait of Mlle. Lange as Danae =

1799 painting by French painter Anne-Louis Girodet de Roussy-Trioson

Portrait of M^{lle} Lange as Danaë
- Artist: Anne-Louis Girodet de Roussy-Trioson
- Year: 1799
- Medium: Oil on canvas
- Subject: Anne Françoise Elisabeth Lange
- Dimensions: 60.33 cm × 48.58 cm (23.75 in × 19.13 in)
- Location: Minneapolis Institute of Art, Minneapolis

The Portrait of M^{lle} Lange as Danaë is a painting by French painter Anne-Louis Girodet de Roussy-Trioson. This satirical painting of the actress Anne Françoise Elisabeth Lange as Danaë replaced a portrait of the actress for the last two days of the Paris Salon of 1799, after a dispute between the artist and the sitter. It is now part of the collection of the Minneapolis Institute of Arts.

== History ==
The artist Girodet and Lange first crossed paths in the Salon of 1793. Girodet, a student of Jacques-Louis David would gain notoriety for his submission Endymion. In 1793, Lange was already a prominent actress and a sociétaire of the Comédie-Française. Her likeness as Sylvie by Jean-François Gilles Colson is in the same gallery of 1793.

Six years later (1798), as a gift to her newlywed husband, Michel-Jean Simons, Madame Simons commissioned a portrait from Girodet. Lange disliked the painting so much that in a letter written to the artist, she requested that he remove the painting from the Paris Salon and offered only half of Girodet's asking price. Further, she wrote that his work compromised not only her reputation for beauty but his own as an up-and-coming artist.

Furious, the 32-year old Girodet began work on a new painting of Lange in the guise of Danae. The painting is deliberately encoded with hidden details about her intimate life, in an effort to defame her. On August 2, 1799, Girodet exacted his revenge. After destroying the portrait by cutting it up into four pieces, Girodet directed the hanging of his depiction of Lange as Danae in the Salon Carré., after working on it for 19 days.

== Symbolism ==
Lange is depicted gathering gold pieces in a sheet. This common scene from the shower of gold episode associated with Danae was used by Girodet to portray Lange as a greedy person. The winged putto helping her collect gold coins is Palmyre, her daughter from an affair with a banker. She is accompanied by a turkey bearing a wedding ring on its foot. This symbolizes the husband, Simons. There is an infant, representing the son, gathering peacock feathers that are growing from the turkey. The mother and the children have been adorned with headdresses fashioned out of peacock feathers.

Two white doves are bound to a scale, each bearing a Latin inscription. An allusion to adultery (Latin: fidelitas) is found around the neck of the bird that has been crushed to death by one of the gold coins. The other (Latin: constantia) is written around the neck of the bird that gotten away, suggesting once more that her character is unsteady.

In the background, a statue of Abundantia is dimly lit by a small fire that has drawn moths. At the base of the statue is yet another Latin expression (Latin: bonæ spei et. laribus sacrum).

Additionally, the four corners of the frame have been decorated with ornate cameo reliefs, each bearing Latin phrases or mottos:

Inscriptions
Image	Latin	Source	English
Mermaid	desin[a]t in piscem mulier formosa superne [spectatum admissi] risum teneatis amici?	Ars Poetica by Horace	A metaphor for vanity.
Creature	desin[a]t in piscem mulier formosa superne [spectatum admissi] risum teneatis amici?	Ars Poetica by Horace	Having a laugh, friends?
Gold	trahit sua quemque voluptas	Eclogue 2 by Virgil	Each is led by their own delights
Ox	nec pluribus impar	affiliated with Louis XIV	No direct English translation

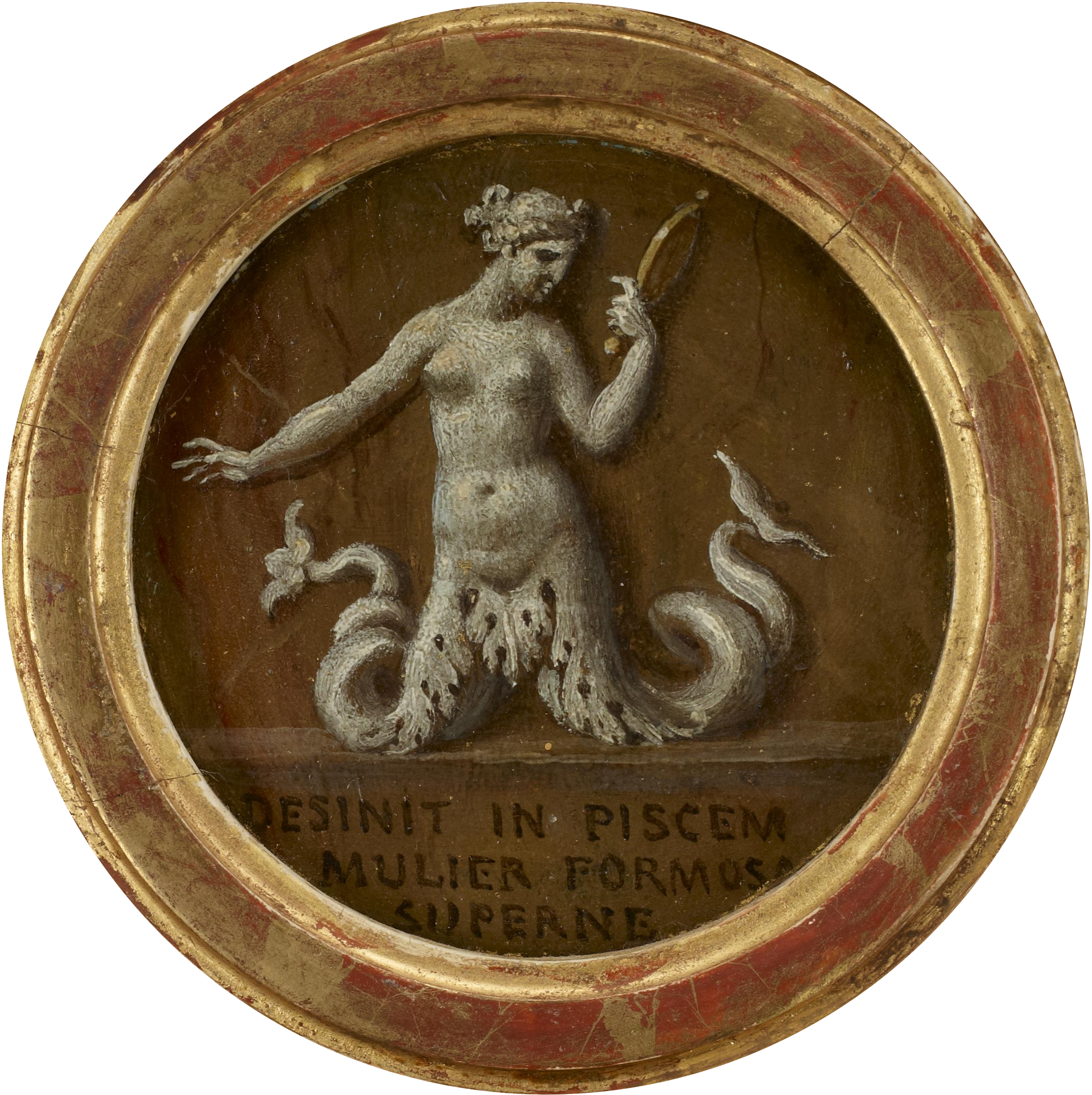
Mermaid, or a fish-tailed woman gazing into a mirror.

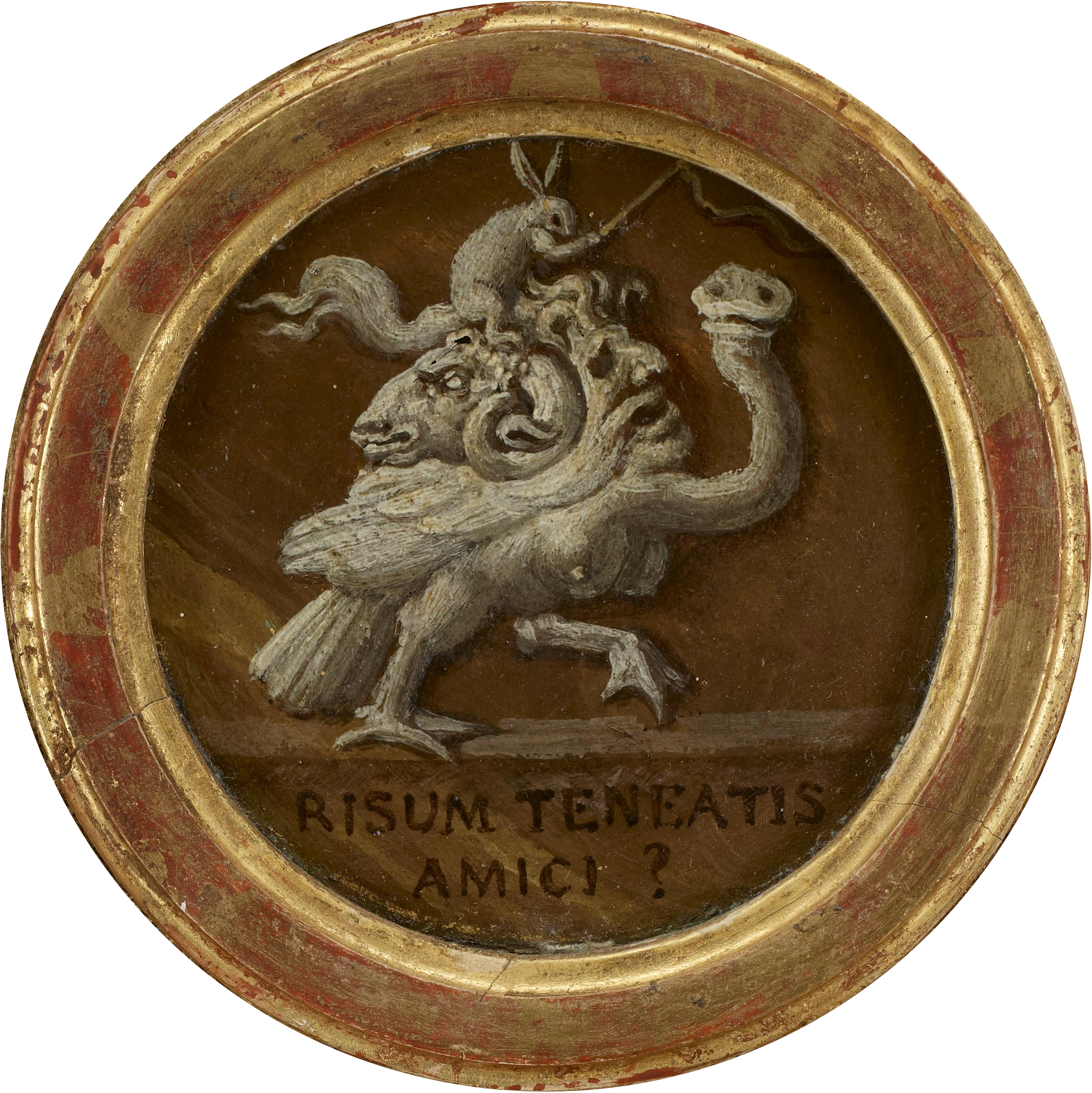
Creature with a rabbit rider.

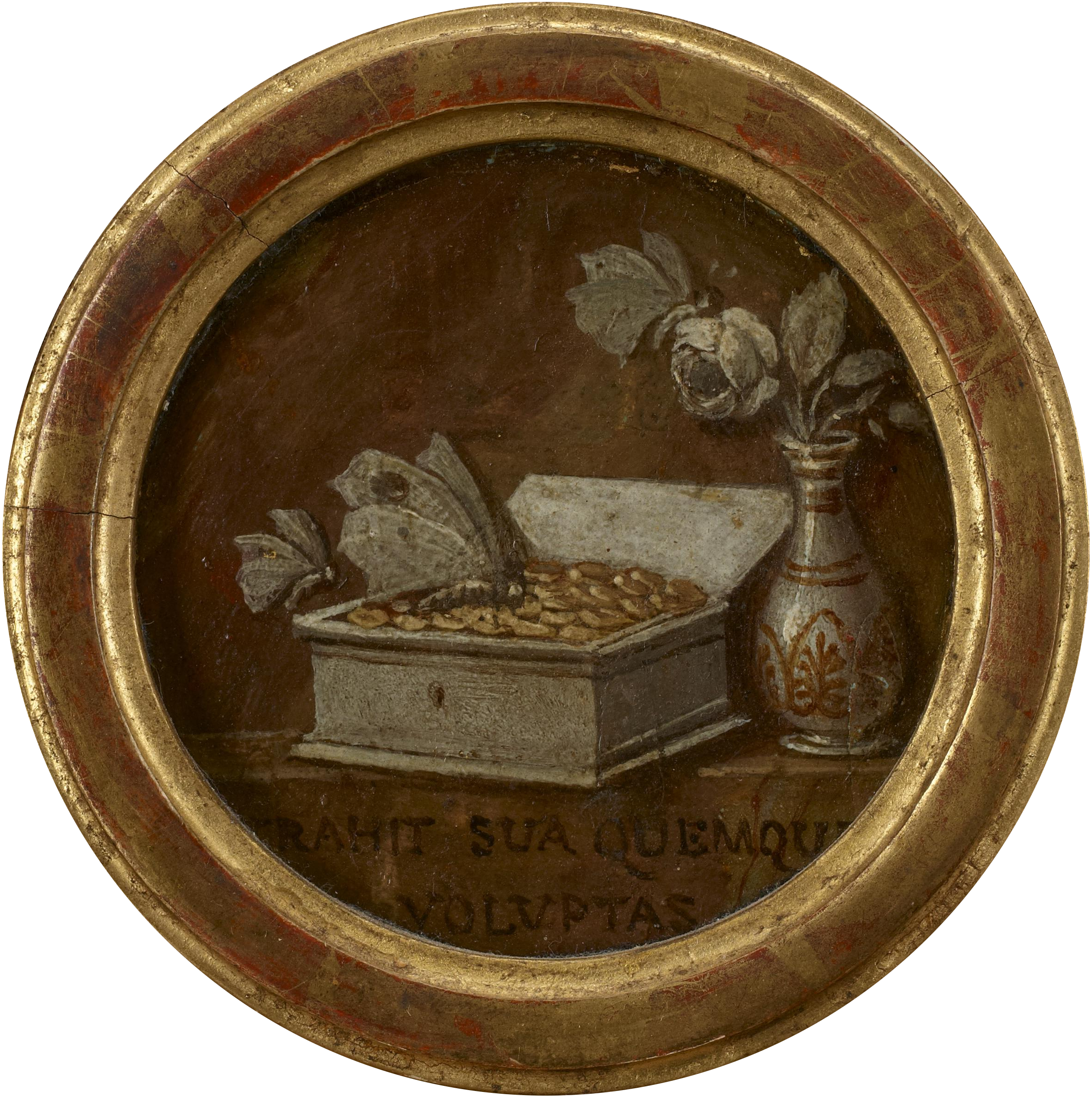
Gold coins in a treasure box, drawing moths. Shown with a vase of flowers.

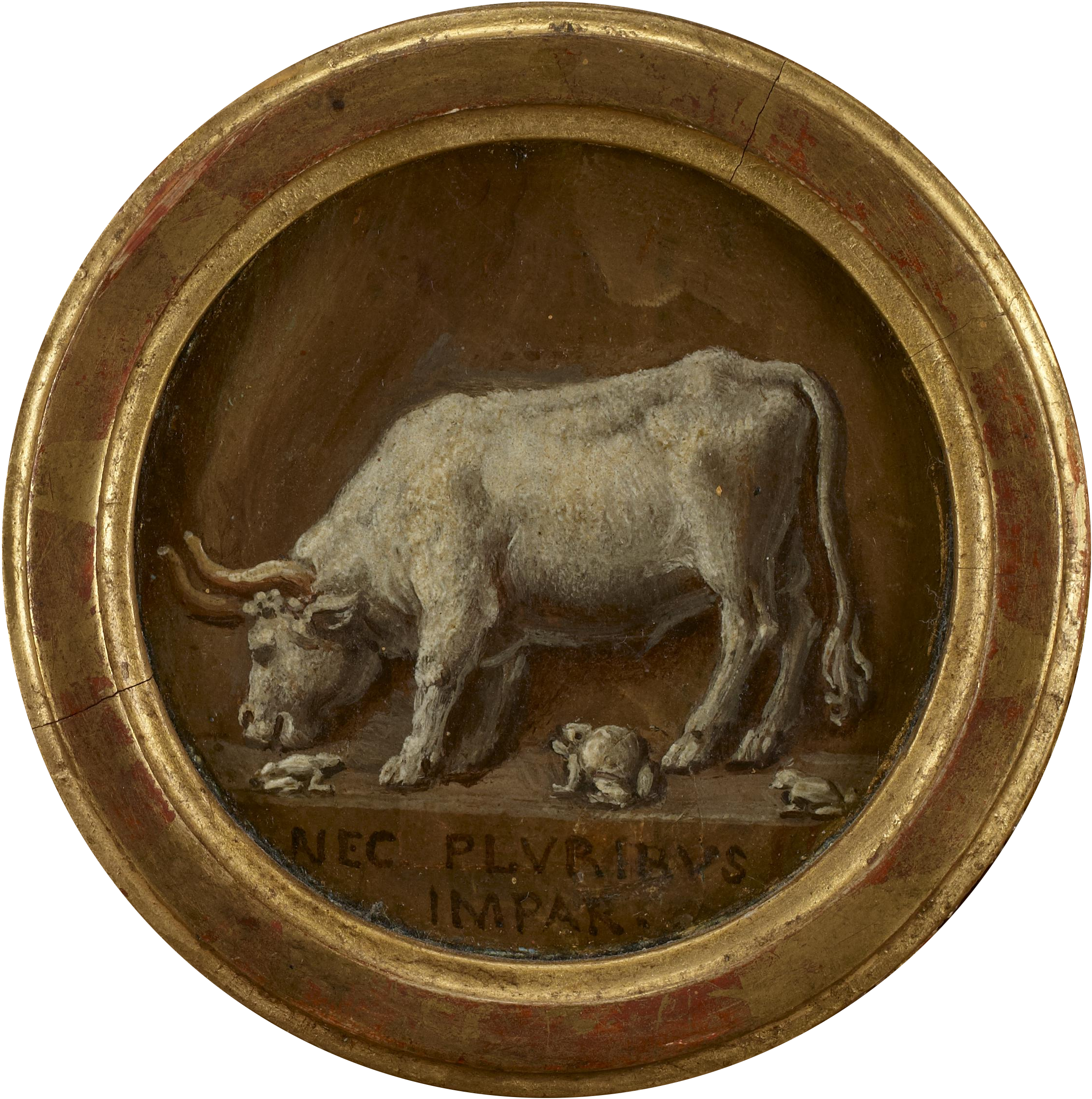
Ox, with reference to La Fontaine's version of Aesop's fable The Frog and the Ox

Her mirror, now broken and producing no reflection is an attribute of Vanitas used together with the mermaid. On the floor, a scroll of the play ASINARIA COMŒDIA as per PLAVTI is set ablaze upon her sandal.

Another lover of Lange, removed from her pedestal, is depicted in the shadowy area below Danae's seat. Called a satyr by some scholars, the grimacing head is crowned by vine leaves in the likeness of a wigmaker named after a certain N. Leuthrop. A snail rests upon one of its leaves. Beauregard is said to have paid a lot amount of money for half a day's worth of her time, which is symbolized with gold coin lodged into the right eye socket of the figure.

The foot supporting Lange's seat has been splintered, and is stabilized by a brick. A mouse, caught in a trap, is seen next to the face of the illegitimate marquis of Beauregard.

== Impact ==
Although Danae was exhibited for just a few days, it was demonstrated at the Louvre during the height of the French Directory. Wishing to be forgotten, Lange left France for Italy, where she found a new foothold. Some years later, she returned to France to visit and see how the city had changed. There, she saw a print after Girodet's Danae, to which she remarked (French: Ce portrait me fera mourir de chagrin) that the painting would make her die of grief. After her brief return to France, Lange moved back to Florence, but also spent time at her chateau in Bossey, near Lake Leman. Though her husband, Michel-Jean Simons, had gone bankrupt, his lack of funds did not affect her. She separated their money and continued to live well for the rest of her life. She died in 1825.

Girodet himself later expressed remorse over creating the painting, and refused to show it to friends.

== Gallery ==
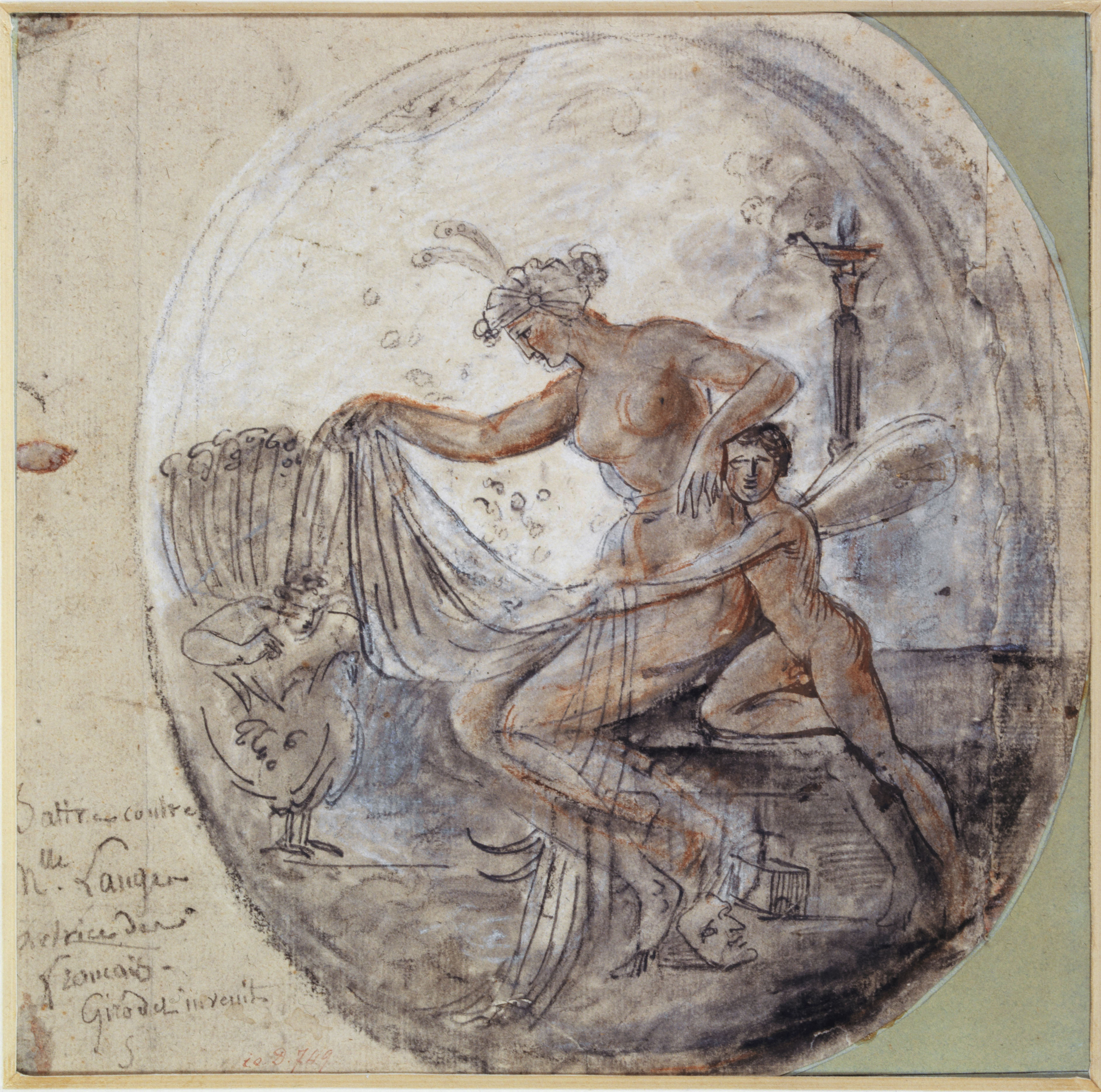
Preliminary sketch

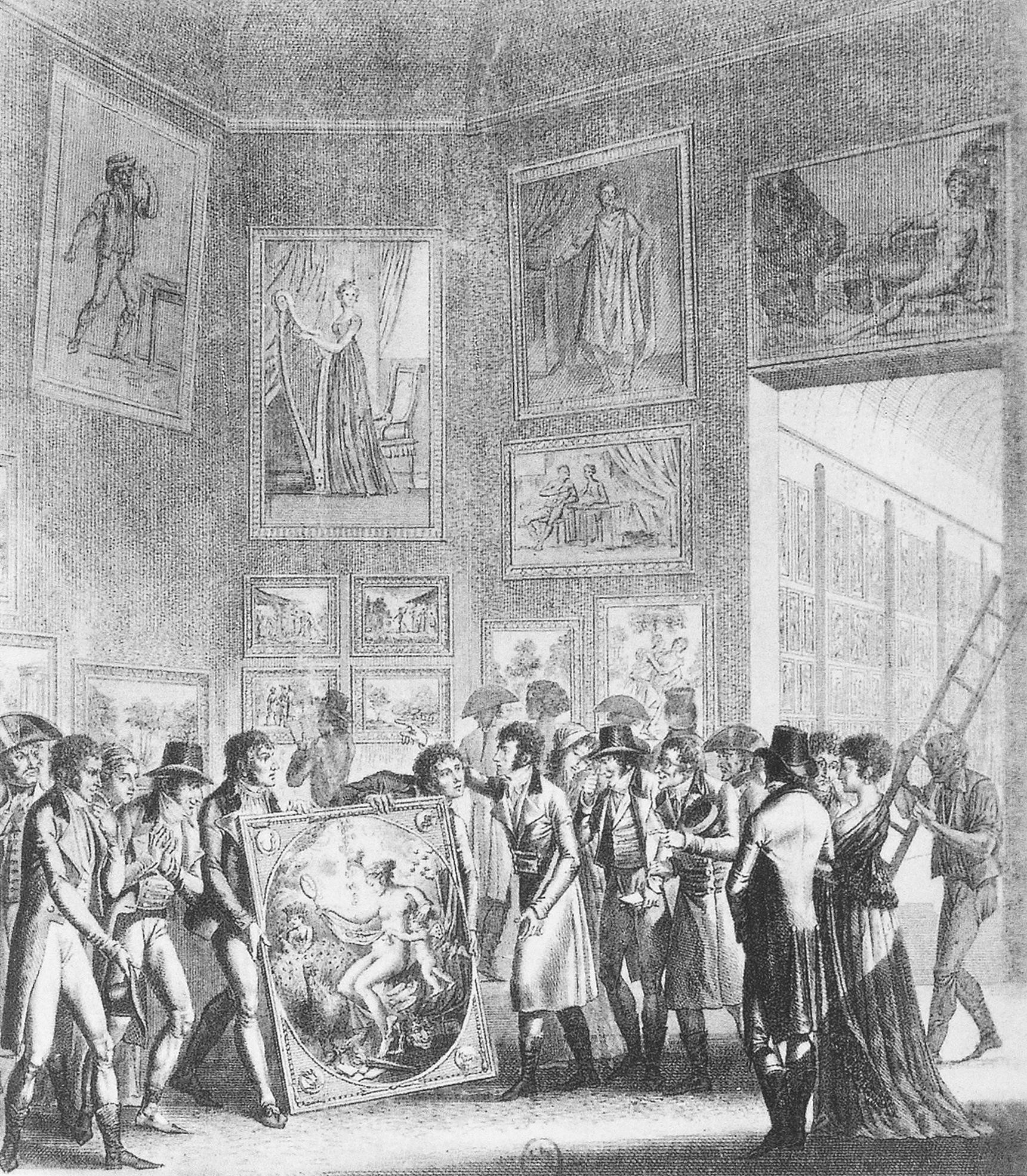
Girodet places La Danaé moderne in the Salon Carré. Engraving by Thomas Charles Naudet.

Unframed Danaë

== See also ==
- Scandals in art#18th century
