= The Return of Marcus Sextus =

Painting by Pierre-Narcisse Guérin

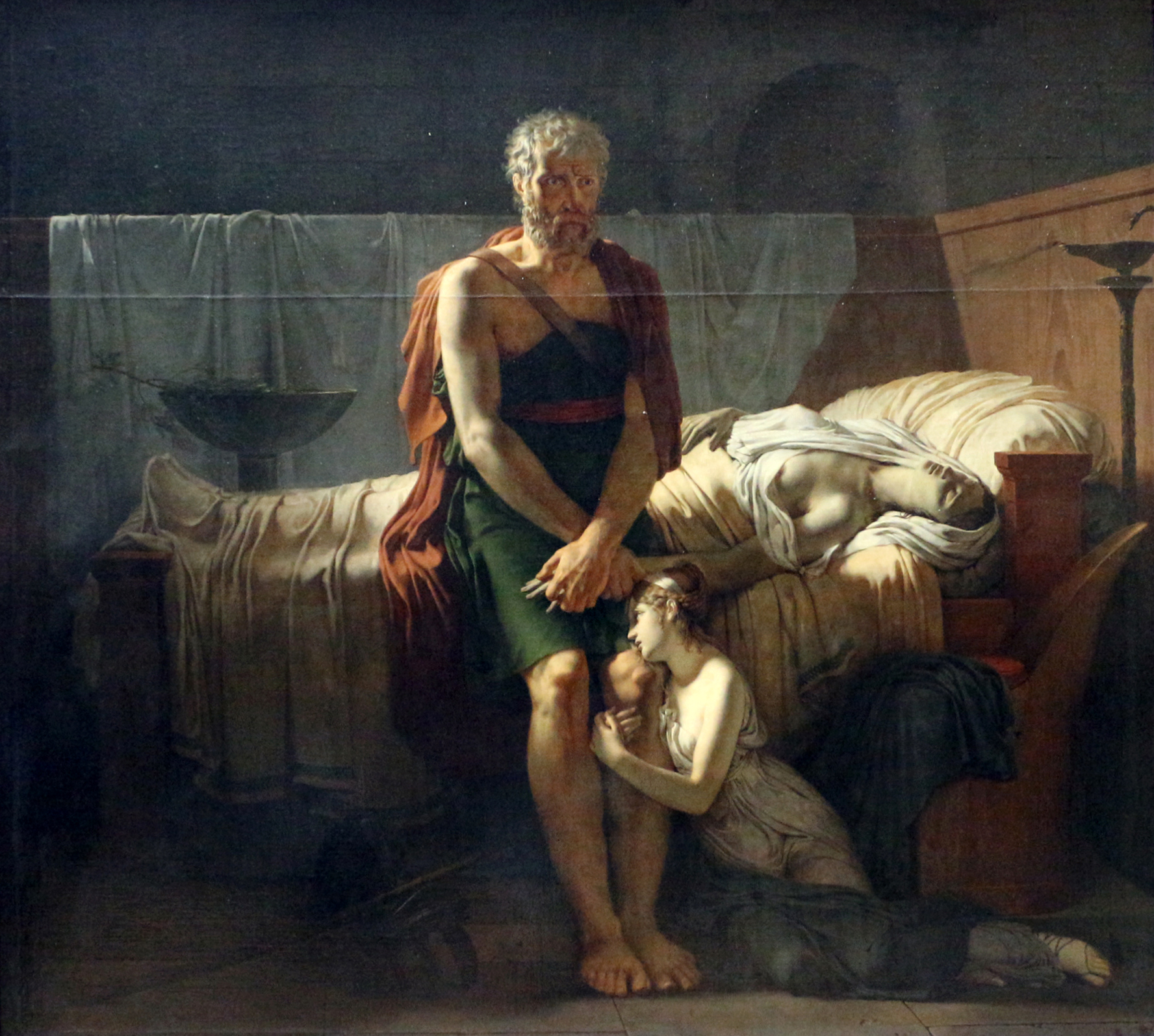
- Artist: Pierre-Narcisse Guérin
- Year: 1799
- Type: history painting
- Medium: Oil on canvas
- Dimensions: 217 cm × 243 cm (85 in × 96 in)
- Location: Louvre; Paris

The Return of Marcus Sextus (French: Le Retour de Marcus Sextus) is an oil-on-canvas history painting by the French artist Pierre-Narcisse Guérin from 1799. It debuted at the Salon of 1799 and became one of the most celebrated works of the post-Terror era. Now housed in the Louvre, it shows a fictional Roman general returning home from exile only to discover that his wife is dead. Many contemporaries interpreted the work as an allegory of the return of émigrés after the Reign of Terror in Revolutionary France.

== Context ==
After the fall of Robespierre in 1794, public sympathy remained strong for the 100,000 to 150,000 émigrés banished from France during the French Revolution. This climate shaped responses at the Salon, where François Gérard’s Belisarius found acclaim, resonating with contemporary feelings towards exiles with its depiction of the unfairly punished Byzantine general. Likely encouraged by the success of Gérard’s painting, Guérin began developing his own image of a returning exile for the Salon.

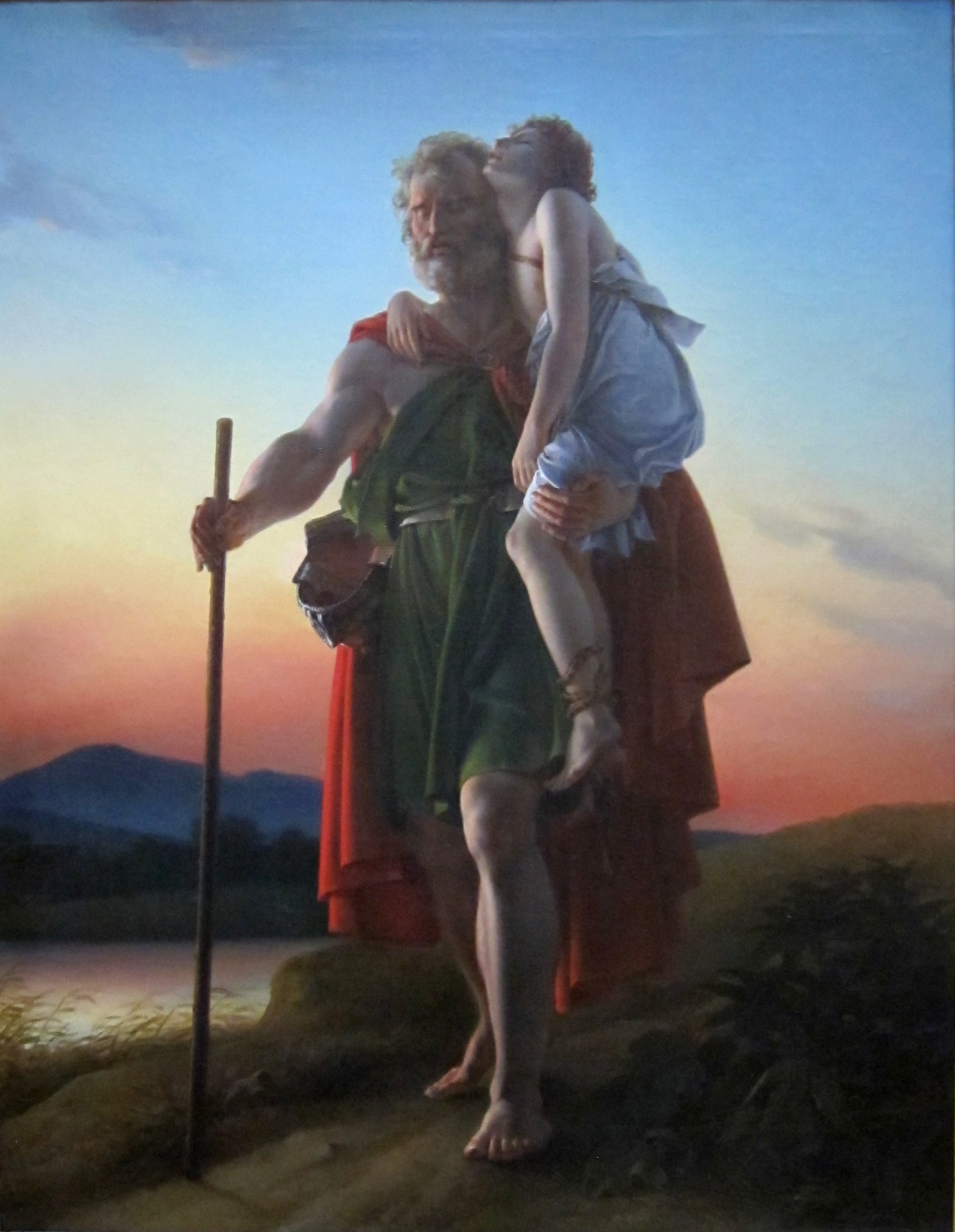
François Gérard, Belisarius, 1797

Originally conceived as Return of Belisarius to his Family, the work was intended to feature the figure of Belisarius. However, late in the process, and possibly after the initial painting's completion, Guérin altered the subject after another artist advised him to change it since Belisarius had already been used as a subject by both David and Gérard. In changing the subject, Guérin fabricated the central figure of his history painting and left Belisarius's features, helmet, and staff in the bottom left of the foreground as remnants of the work's original version.

== Description ==
The painting depicts the fictional Roman general Marcus Sextus, who had been proscribed during the rule of Sulla. After Sulla's fall, he returned to Rome to find his wife dead. The painting shows Marcus Sextus in a gloomy room, silent and still, visibly heartbroken, in front of the bed where his dead wife is lying, his fingers gently entwined with her lifeless hand. Her daughter grabs his leg, in mourning. His wife lies, pale, in bed, with one of her breasts exposed.

== Interpretation ==
Guérin’s decision to represent an invented Roman exile instead of a historically accurate figure let the painting function as a direct allegory for the situation in the French Republic, following the Reign of Terror. The contemporary audience likened Sulla to Robespierre, and Marcus Sextus to the French émigrés who were returning to the country under the more moderate rule of the Directory. Whiteley notes that early viewers came to independently interpret the painting in the context of émigrés’ reentry into French society following the Terror, but he alongside other sources argue that the allegory was likely intentional. Some viewers felt the work was an attack on David's reputation despite the clear influence of Andromache Mourning Hector played with its similarly symbolic smoking candelabrum and the nature of the relationships portrayed in both pieces.

The strong chiaroscuro intensifies the emotional gloom and despair emanating from the painting. The space is arranged like a theatrical stage set, which matches thematically with Sextus's dramatic expression. These traits take after David's late eighteenth-century history painting but are used for a different purpose here than in works such as Brutus and The Oath of the Horatii. While David used these elements to underscore civic virtue and public heroism, Guérin's implementations intensify the feeling of personal loss. According to Stefan Germer, The Return of Marcus Sextus abandons the traditional exemplum virtutis in favor of a scene of private suffering, a shift Ribner states is central to early nineteenth-century French art. O’Brien similarly interprets the painting’s message of compassion for émigrés as politically oppositional to Hennequin’s Jacobin-leaning allegories of revolutionary uprising.

== Reception ==
At the opening of the Salon of 1799, Hennequin's Grand Prize-winning Tenth of August was considered the only ambitious painting on display. Six weeks later, Guérin submitted The Return of Marcus Sextus, which immediately eclipsed it and any other would-be exhibition rivals. Accounts detail that the painting drew packed crowds, adornments of garlands and verses to its frame, and three banquets in Guérin's honor; Hennequin himself was even reportedly urged to place a garland on top of the work.

Rubin points to The Return of Marcus Sextus as Guérin’s most acclaimed work, citing Delécluze's written recollection that it was "greeted by the public with applause the likes of which no subsequent success can convey." The painting's acclaim aligned with public rejection of Jacobin imagery out of fear of the Terror's return. As O’Brien notes, enthusiasm for Marcus Sextus expressed preference for reconciliation with émigrés over celebrations of revolutionary radicalism.

Today it is in the collection of the Louvre, in Paris, having been acquired in 1830.

== Cultural references ==
Madame De Staël wrote about this painting in her novel Delphine (1802).
