= Louis Pierre Gratiolet =

French anatomist and zoologist (1815–1865)

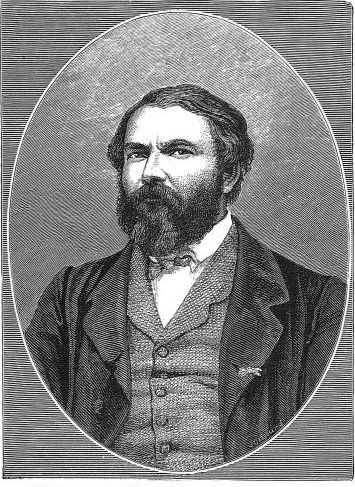
Pierre Gratiolet (1815-1865)

Louis Pierre Gratiolet (French: [ɡʁasjɔlɛ]; 6 July 1815 – 16 February 1865) was a French anatomist and zoologist who was a native of Sainte-Foy-la-Grande, Gironde. He succeeded Isidore Geoffroy Saint-Hilaire (1805-1861) as professor of zoology to the Faculty of Sciences at the University of Paris.

Gratiolet is remembered for his work in neuroanatomy, physiognomy and physical anthropology. He did extensive research in the field of comparative anatomy, and performed important studies regarding the differences and similarities between human and various primate brains. He is also credited for introducing the demarcation of the brain's cortical surface into five lobes, (frontal lobe, temporal lobe, parietal lobe, occipital lobe and insular cortex).

With Paul Broca (1824-1880) he performed correlative studies of aphasia and the frontal lobe. Gratiolet was a vocal critic of Broca regarding the latter's belief that a larger brain equated to higher intelligence.

== Associated eponym ==
- Gratiolet's radiation: also known as the geniculocalcarine tract. The massive, fan-like fiber system passing from the lateral geniculate body of the thalamus to the visual cortex.

== Selected writings ==
- Anatomie comparée du système nerveux considéré dans ses rapports avec l’intelligence, with François Leuret, Paris, Ballière, vol 1, 1839.
- Mémoire sur les Plis Cérébraux de l'Homme et des Primates. Paris: Bertrand, 1854.
- De la Physiognomie et des Mouvements d'Expression (About physiognomy and the movements of expression) 1865.
- Recherches sur l’anatomie de l’hippopotame. (Research on the anatomy of the hippopotamus) 1867.
