= Jean-Baptiste-Maximien Parchappe de Vinay =

French psychiatrist

Jean-Baptiste-Maximien Parchappe de Vinay (21 October 1800 – 12 March 1866) was a French psychiatrist who was a native of Épernay, Marne.

Parchappe de Vinay studied in medicine in Rouen and Paris, earning his medical doctorate in 1827. From 1835 to 1848 he practiced psychiatry at the Maison de Saint-Yon in Rouen. In 1848, he was appointed inspector-general of French mental asylums and sanitation services of prisons.

With Guillaume Ferrus (1784–1861) and Jacques-Étienne Belhomme (1800–1880), he was a prominent figure in 19th-century French psychiatry in regards to physicians who believed that the cause of most mental illnesses could be localized anatomically. He performed extensive research involving general paralysis of the insane, and while at Saint-Yon he published a pioneer study of psychiatric statistics titled Recherches statistiques sur les causes de l'alienation mentale.

== Selected publications ==
- Recherches statistiques sur les causes de l'alienation mentale, 1839
- Traité théorique et pratique de la folie, 1841
- Principes à suivre dans la fondation et la construction des asiles d’aliénés, 1853
- Sur un cas de paralysie générale progressive arec désordre des facultés intellectuelles, 1865
