= Salon of 1799 =

1799 art exhibition in Paris

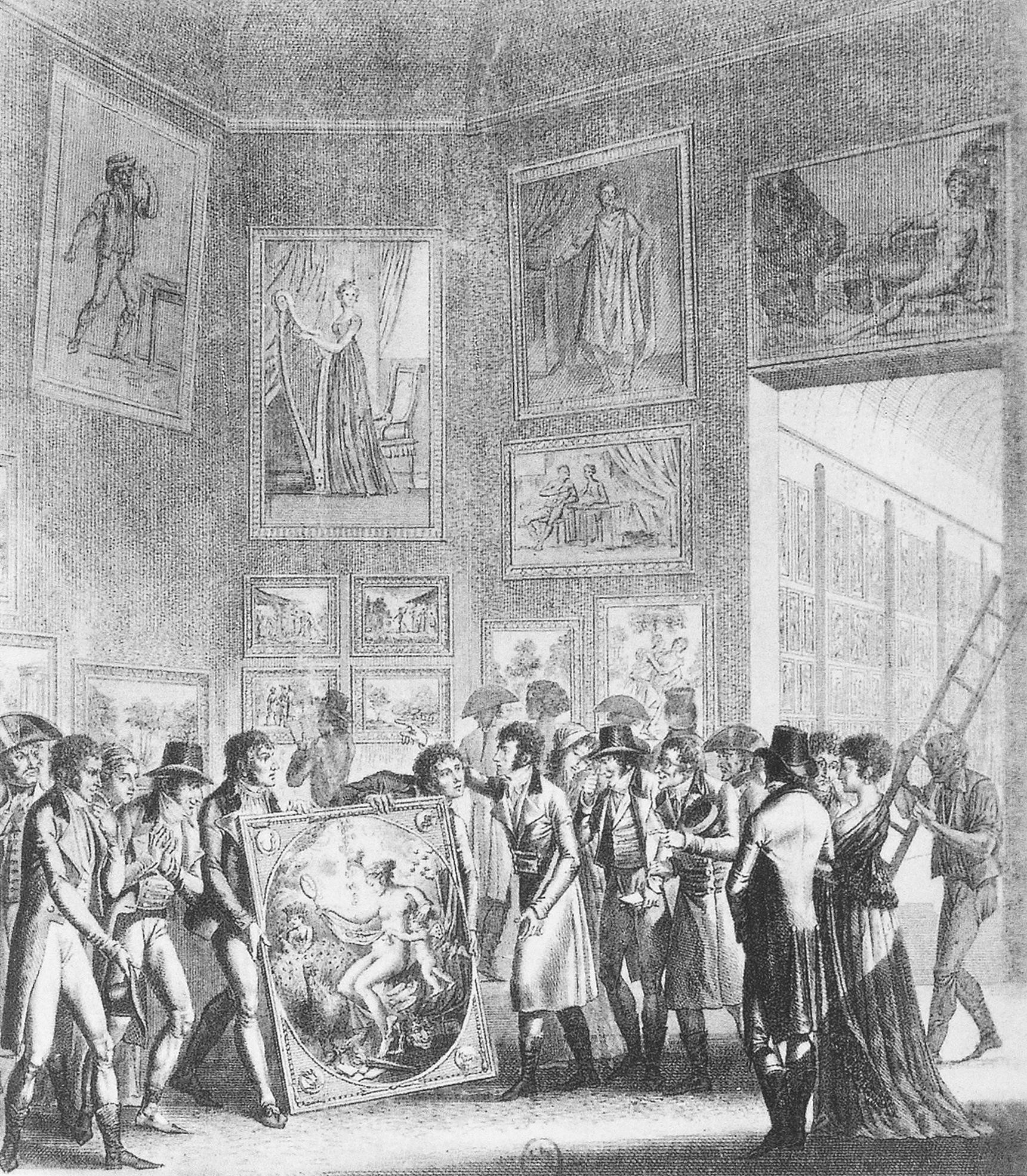
Girodet Directing the Hanging of The New Danae in the Salon

The Salon of 1799 was French art exhibition held at the Louvre in Paris which opened on 18 August 1799. Part of the then-annual sequence of Salons, it took place during the French Directory a few months before Napoleon Bonaparte's Coup established him as dominant ruler. It was held at a time when the government was shifting towards a harder, more Jacobin Republicanism due to the external threats against France.

Girodet, a former pupil of Jacques-Louis David, exhibited his Mademoiselle Lange as Venus. However the portrait of the celebrated theatre actress did not please her feel it reflected her beauty and she refused to pay him the full amount. In return he replaced the portrait at the Salon with a second painting, a mocking allegory Mademoiselle Lange as Danae.The Return of Marcus Sextus by Pierre-Narcisse Guérin featured a neoclassical scene from the era of the Roman Republic. Guillaume Guillon-Lethière exhibited his The Fatherland in Danger, showing volunteers enlisting for military service, which was a popular success.

In portraiture François Gérard, another protégé of David, drew praise for his depiction of Laure Regnaud de Saint-Jean d'Angély. It was followed by the Salon of 1800, the first to be held under the dictatorship of Napoleon.

== Gallery ==
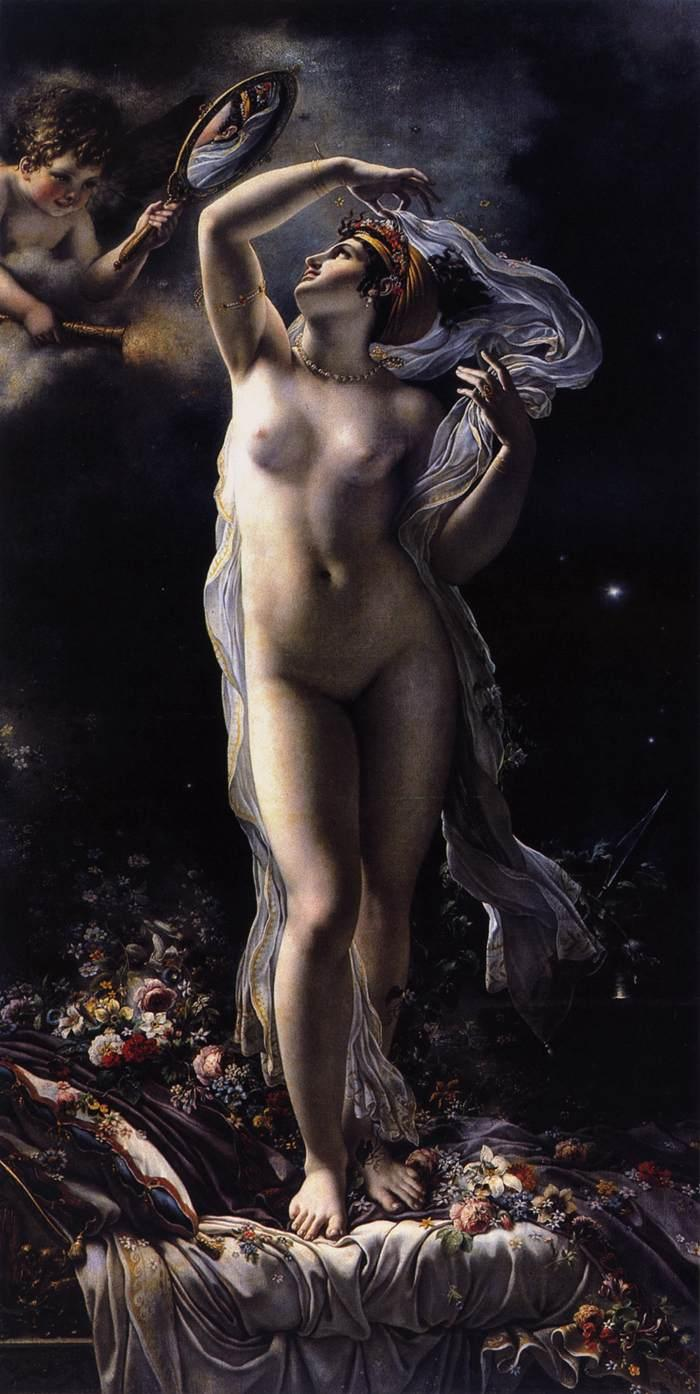
Mademoiselle Lange as Venus by Girodet

Mademoiselle Lange as Danae by Girodet

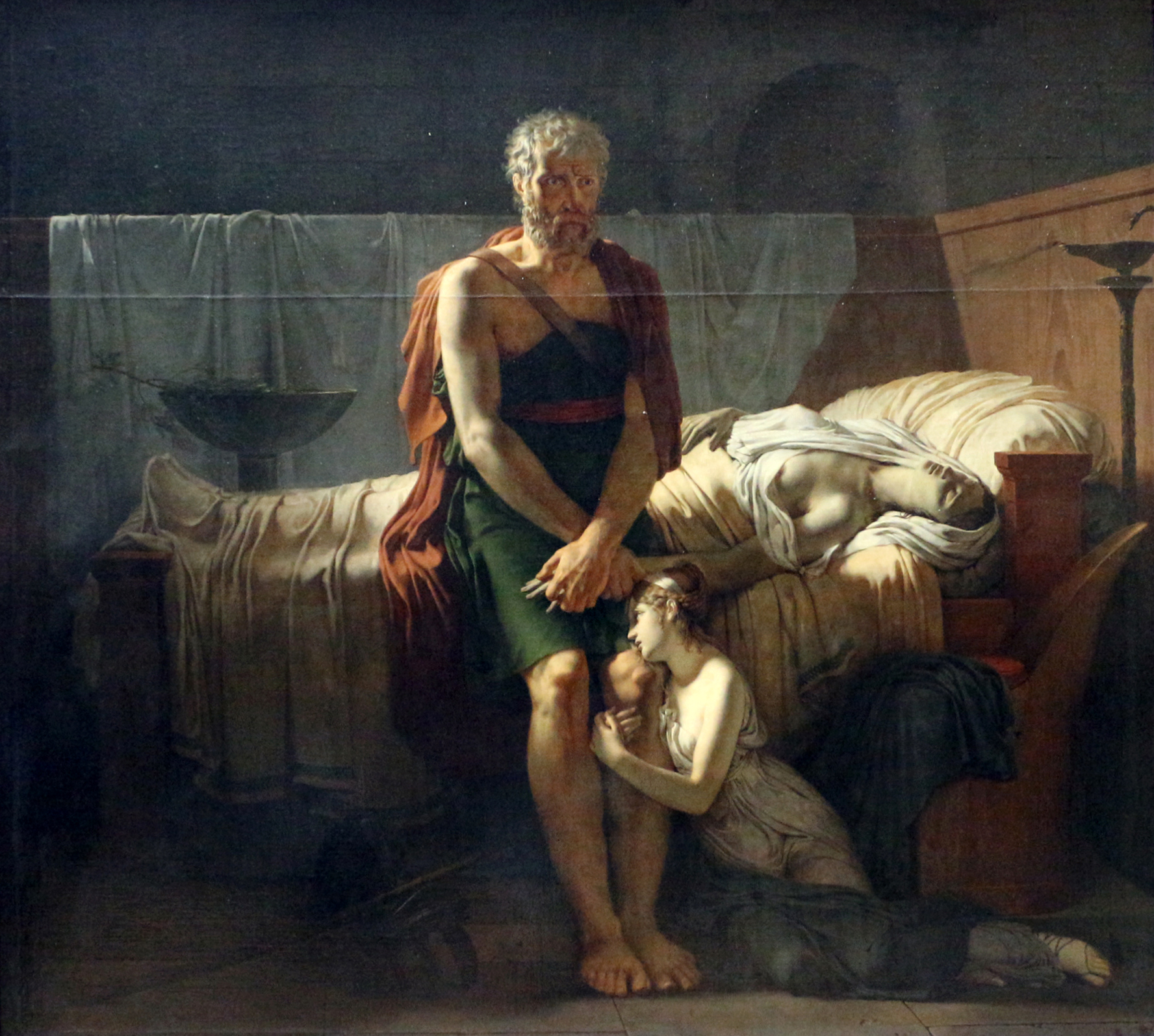
The Return of Marcus Sextus by Pierre-Narcisse Guérin

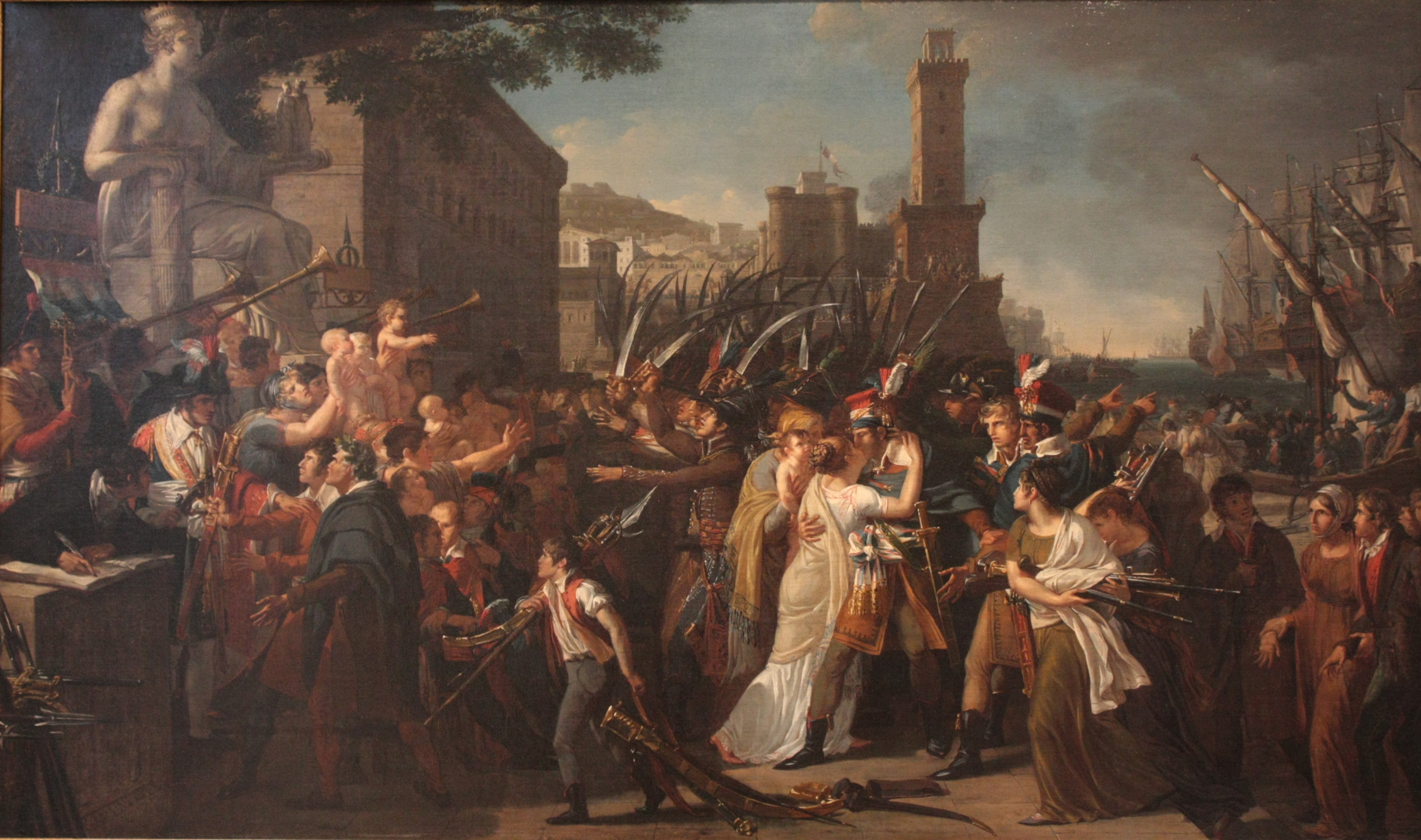
The Fatherland in Danger by Guillaume Guillon-Lethière

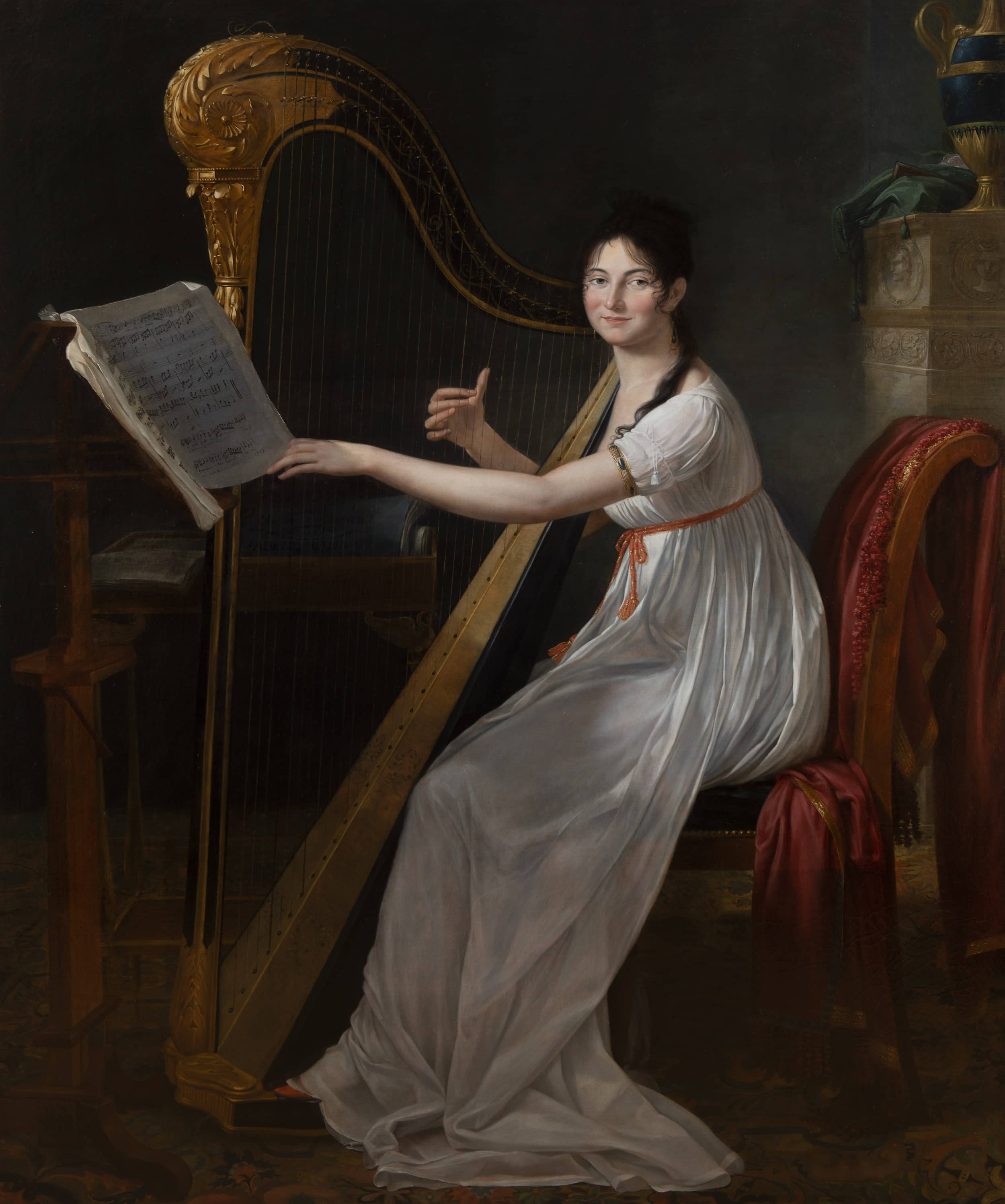
Adèle Papin Playing the Harp by Guillaume Guillon-Lethière

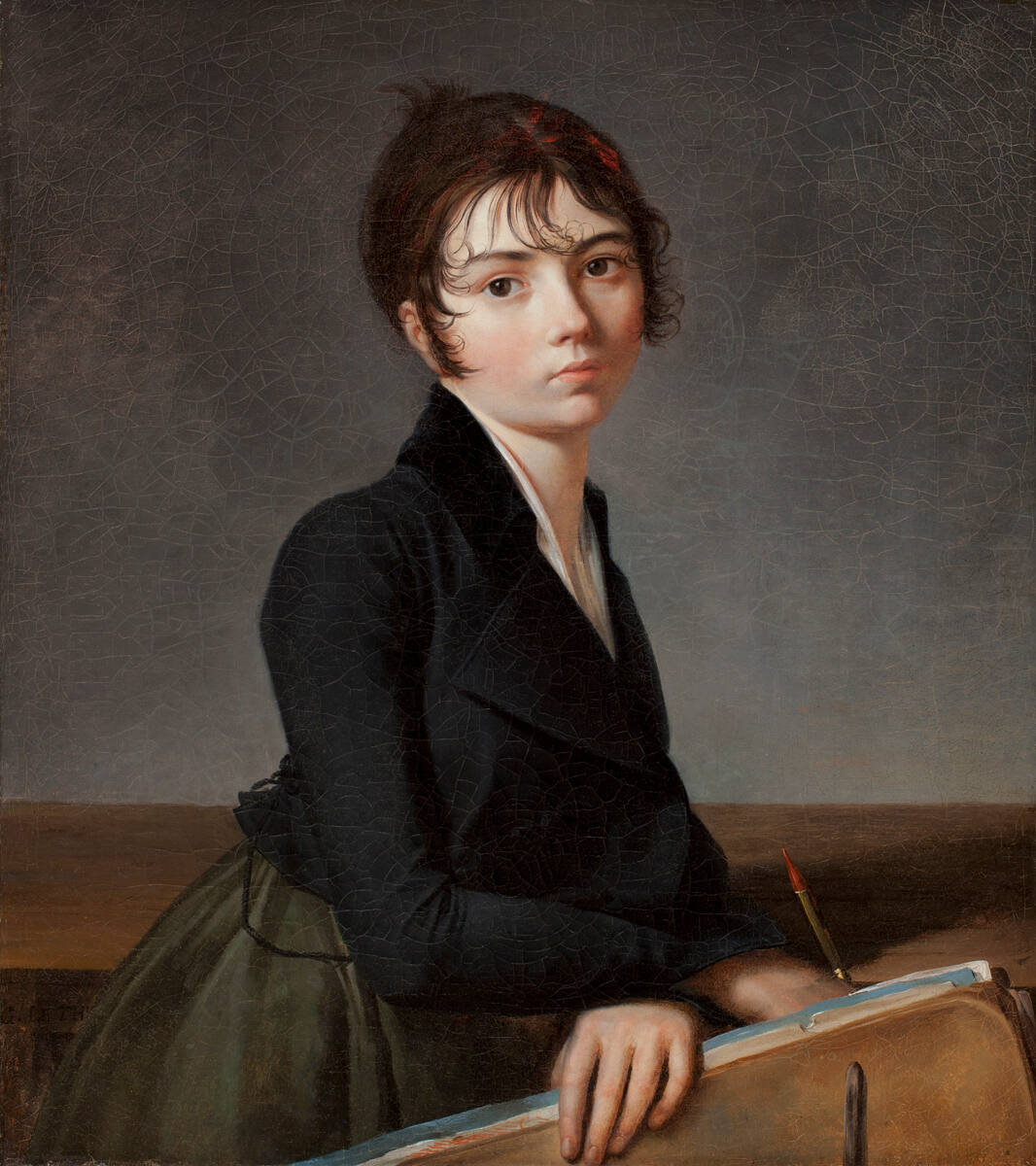
Portrait of a Girl with Portfolio by Guillaume Guillon-Lethière

Young Woman Overtaken by a Storm by Féréol Bonnemaison

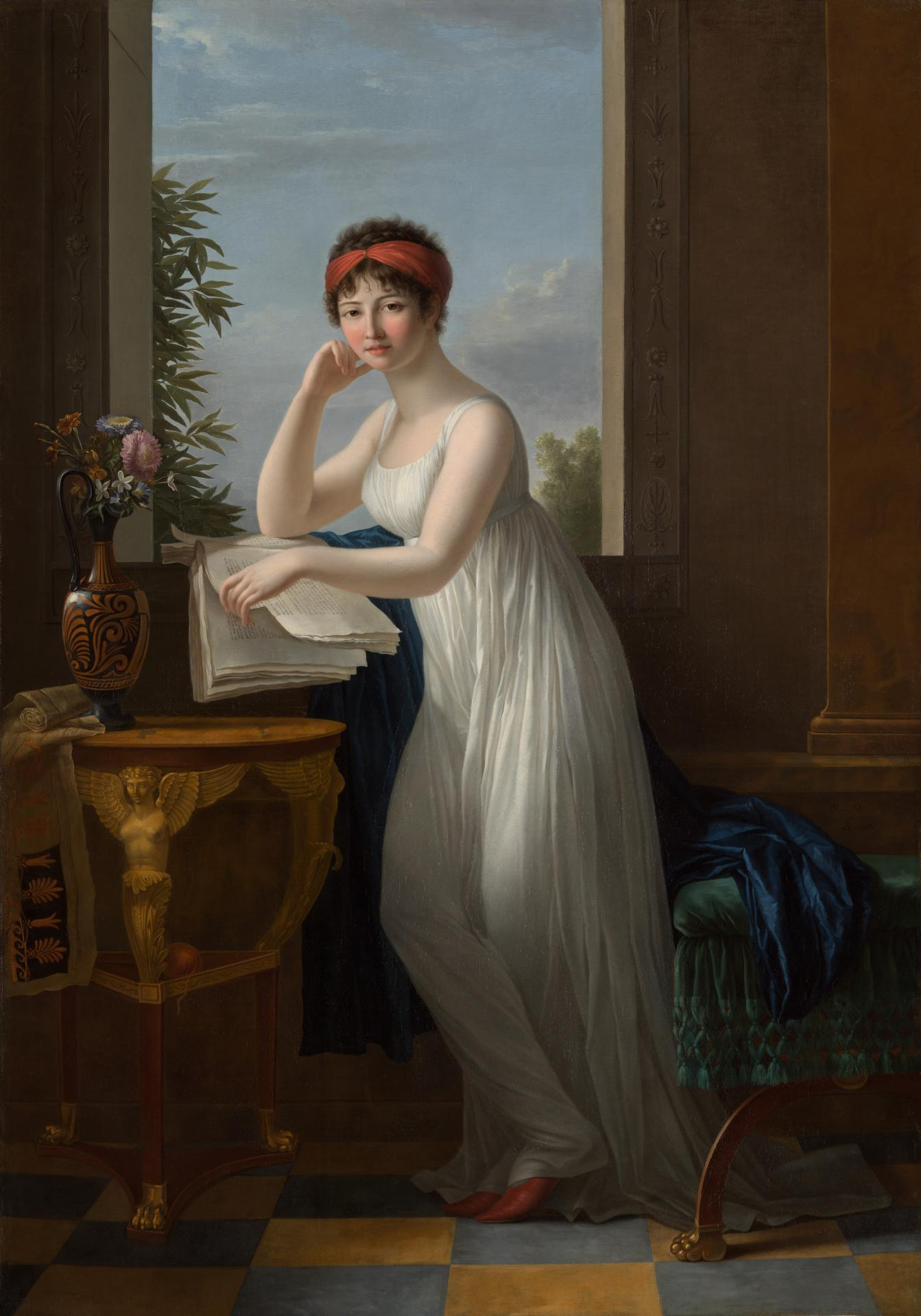
A Young Woman Leaning on the Edge of a Window by Marie-Victoire Lemoine

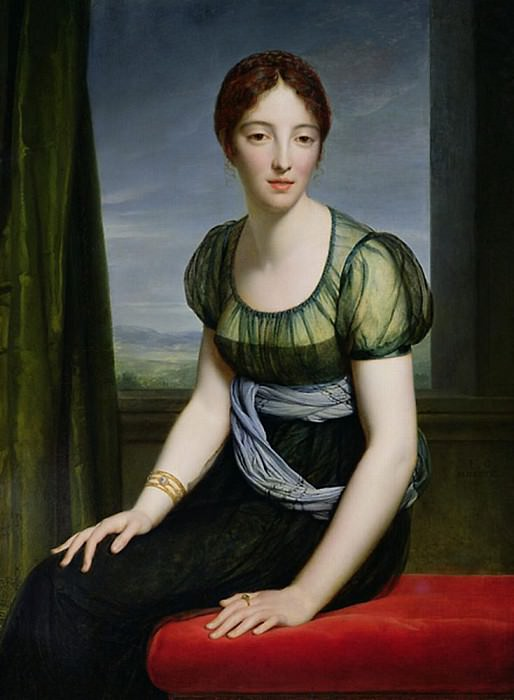
Portrait of Laure de Bonneuil by François Gérard

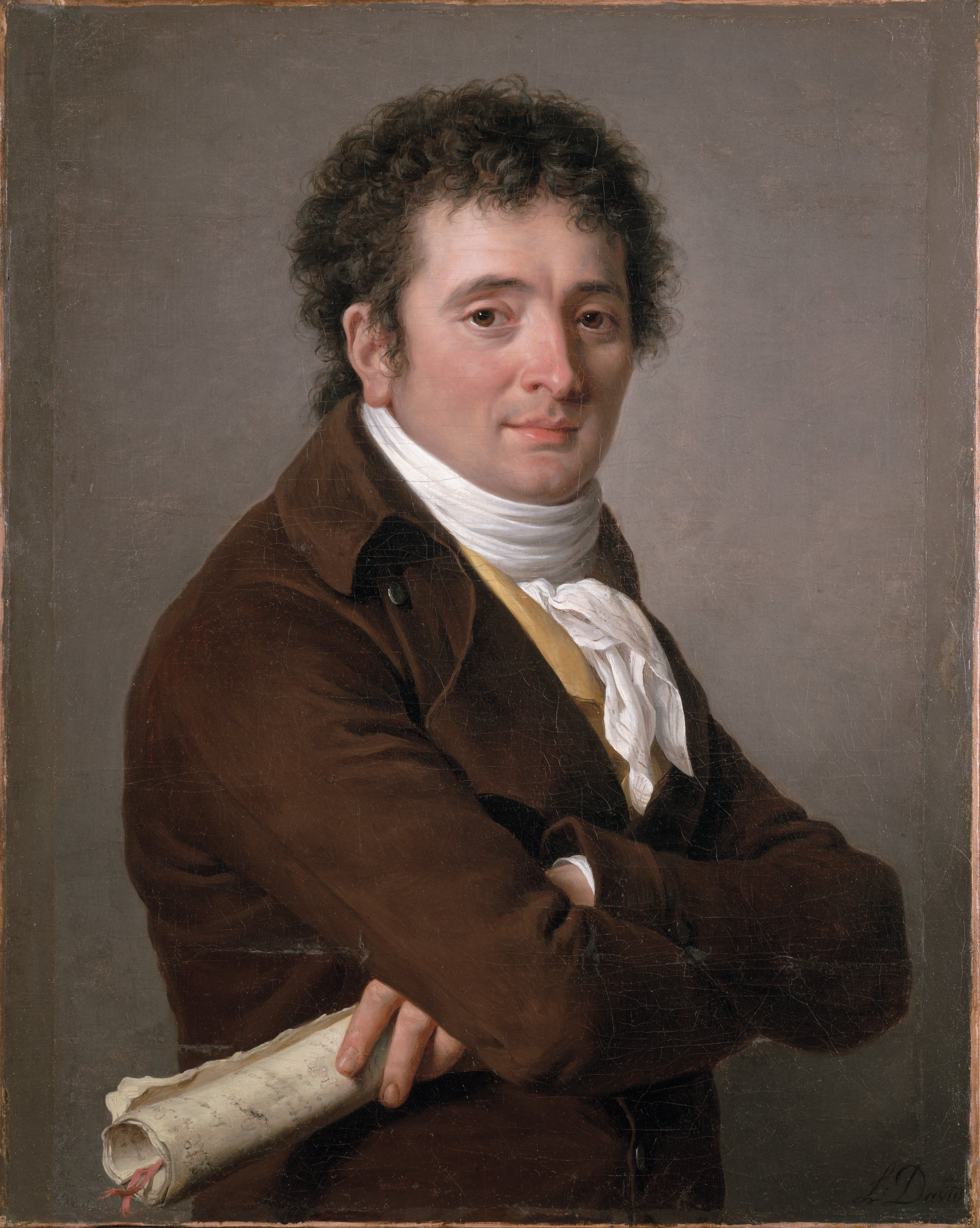
Portrait of Dublin-Tornelle by Adélaïde Labille-Guiard

The Tarantella by Jacques Sablet

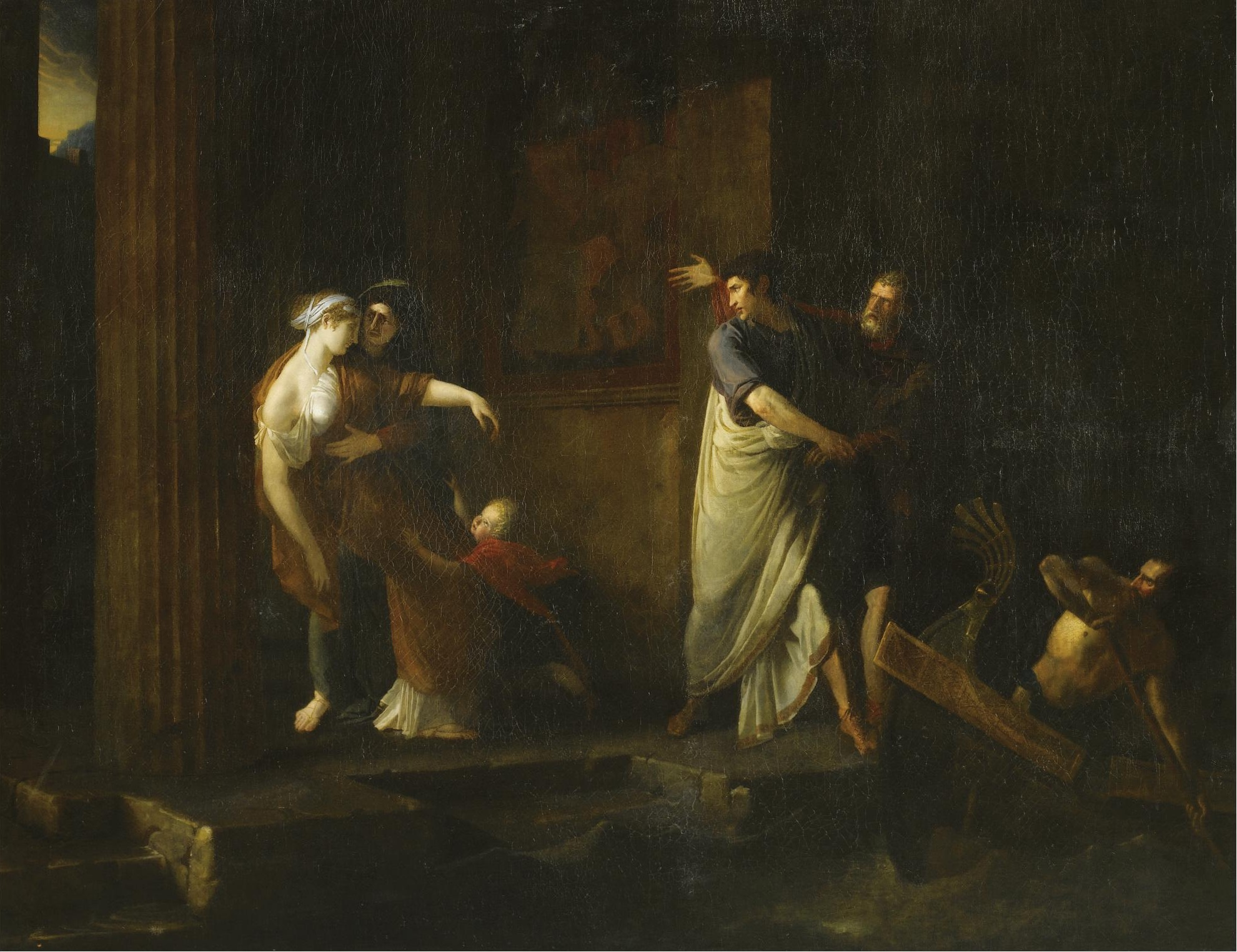
The Farewell of Brutus and Porcia by Antoine Dubost

== See also ==
- Royal Academy Exhibition of 1799, held at Somerset House in London

== Bibliography ==
- Crow, Thomas. Emulation: David, Drouais, and Girodet in the Art of Revolutionary France. Yale University Press, 2006.
- Heuer, Jennifer Ngaire. The Soldier's Reward: Love and War in the Age of the French Revolution and Napoleon. Princeton University Press, 2024.
- Murray, Christopher John. Encyclopedia of the Romantic Era, 1760-1850, Volume 2. Taylor & Francis, 2004.
- Tinterow, Gary & Conisbee, Philip (ed.) Portraits by Ingres: Image of an Epoch. Metropolitan Museum of Art, 1999.
