= François Leuret =

French anatomist and psychiatrist

François Leuret (29 December 1797 – 5 January 1851) was a French anatomist and psychiatrist who was a native of Nancy.

He studied medicine under Jean-Étienne Dominique Esquirol (1772–1840), and was later chief physician at the Bicêtre in Paris. Two of his better known students were Paul Broca (1824–1880) and Louis Pierre Gratiolet (1815–1865). Leuret was also chief-editor of Annales d’hygiène publique et de médecine légale, an influential journal of hygiene and forensic medicine.

Leuret is remembered for his work in comparative anatomy of the brain with Louis Gratiolet. The two men did extensive topographic mapping of the folds and fissures of the cerebral cortex. Leuret coined the name "fissure of Rolando" after Italian anatomist Luigi Rolando (1773–1831) for what is now known as the central sulcus of the brain.

Leuret was an important figure in the early days of French psychiatry. He stressed the importance of using a rational and humane approach in treatment of the mentally ill, and also believed that the criminally insane were sick individuals who were incapable of controlling their behavior. He felt that the origins of mental illness were unknown, and that it was wrong to define madness from only a somatic standpoint. Leuret's psychiatric theories put him at odds with other French physicians, particularly those who thought that the source of mental illness could be localized to a specific part of the brain's anatomy. He was also scornful of the speculative theory of phrenology.

== Selected writings ==
- Du traitement moral de la folie, 1840
- Anatomie comparée du système nerveux, considéré dans ses rapports avec l'intelligence (volume 1- 1839, the second volume published in 1857 by Gratiolet)

== See also ==
- Guillaume Ferrus
