= Michel-Jean Simons =

Belgian supplier to French army

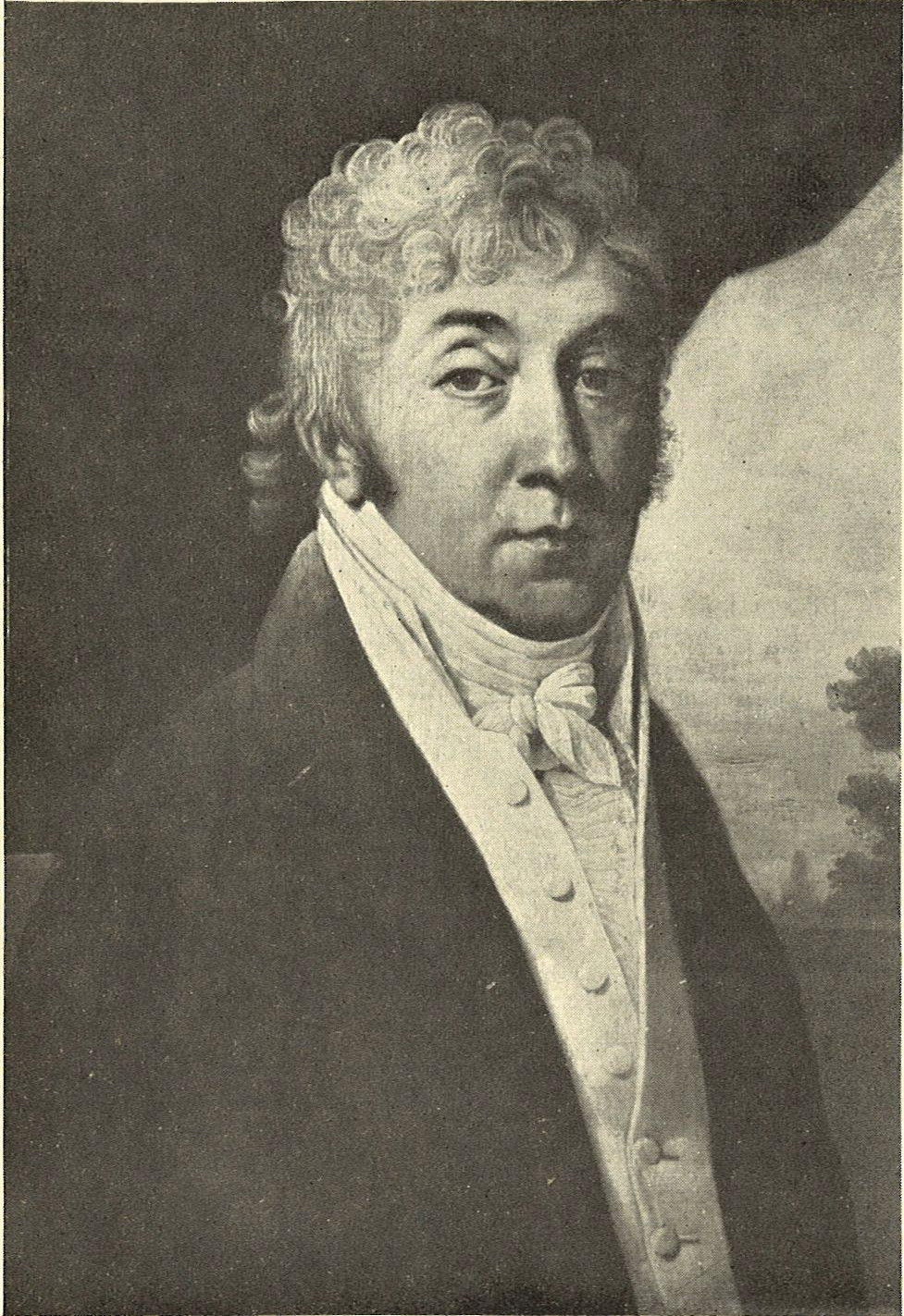
- engraving after work by Robert Lefèvre
- Born: 1762
- Died: 1833 (aged 70–71)
- Occupation: Supplier to the French army
- Spouse: Mademoiselle Lange

Michel-Jean Simons (born 1762) was a supplier to the French army.

On December 24, 1797, he married Mademoiselle Lange. Among the witnesses of their marriage was François de Neufchâteau, one of five members of the French Directory.

He was the owner of three sugar estates in the West Indies.
