= Guillaume Ferrus =

French psychiatrist (1784–1861)

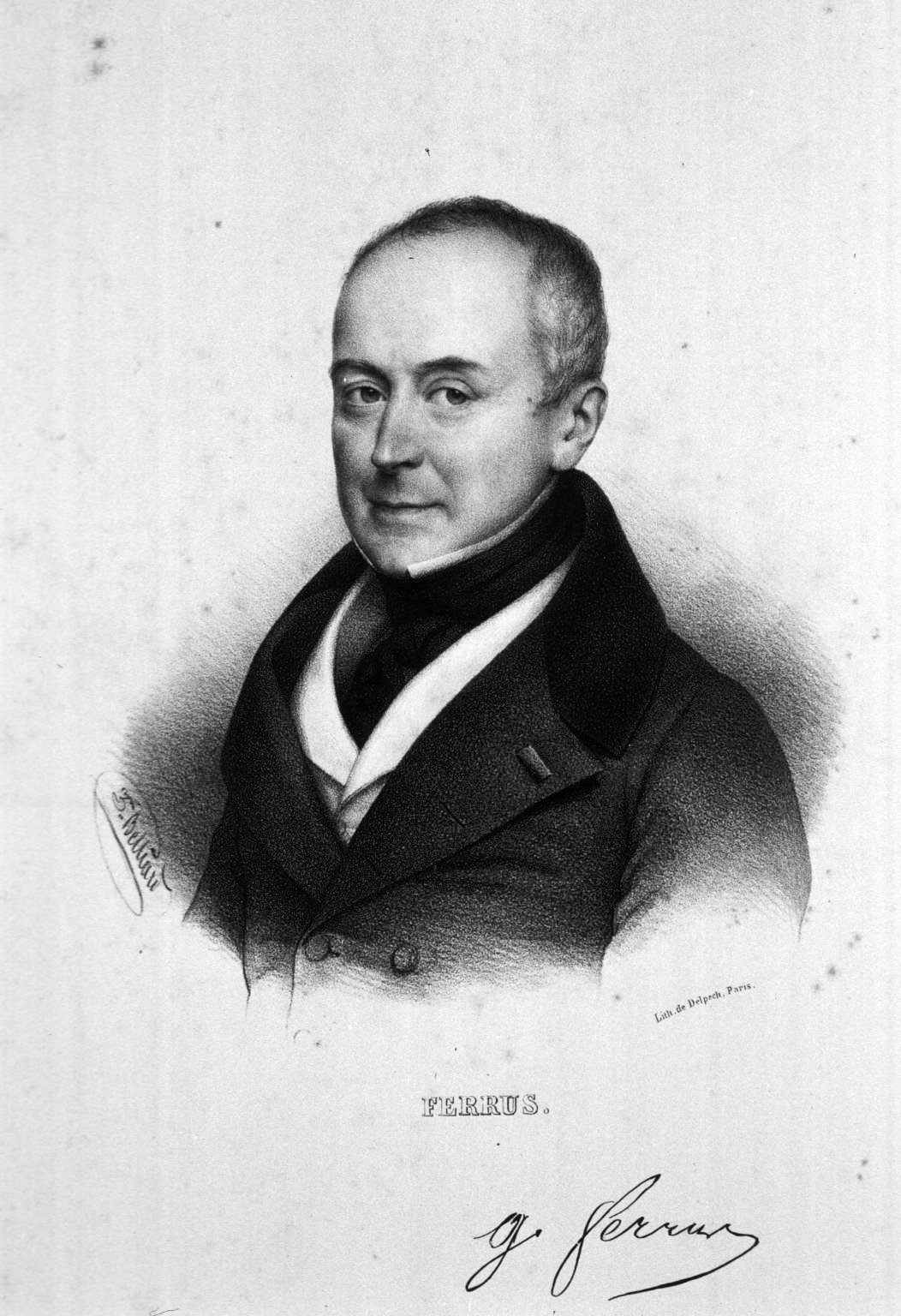
Guillaume Ferrus

Guillaume-Marie-André Ferrus (2 September 1784 – 23 March 1861) was a French psychiatrist born in Château-Queyras, near Briançon, Hautes-Alpes.

He was a student of Philippe Pinel (1745–1826), and for much of his career was associated with the Bicêtre Hospital in a suburb of Paris.

He was one of the founders of Société Médico-Psychologique, and was its first president (1852–53). In 1835 he was appointed inspector-general of mental institutions.

With Pinel and Jean-Étienne Dominique Esquirol (1772–1840), Ferrus was a major force regarding reform of insane asylums in early and mid-19th century France. He founded La Ferme Sainte-Anne, which was an innovative agricultural project designed as work therapy for mental patients.

Ferrus believed that the vast majority of mental illnesses were due to a physical disorder, even if the problem was not anatomically apparent. This viewpoint led to bitter disputes with physicians such as François Leuret (1797–1851), who maintained that somatic disorders were only occasionally the cause of mental illness.

== See also ==
- Jean-Baptiste-Maximien Parchappe de Vinay

== Written works ==
- Des prisonniers, de l'emprisonnement et des prisons (1850).
