= José Benetó Ferrús =

José Benetó Ferrús (1919 in Castelló de la Ribera, Valencia – 2006) was mayor of the first democratic elections in Castelló de la Ribera, being proclaimed as mayor of the City Council first free election of 1979 to 1983, April 19, 1979 for the Socialist Party of the Valencian Country-Spanish Socialist Workers' Party

In the next elections from 1983 to 1987, he was elected with 54.72% of the vote compared to 14.32% for Popular Alliance (the current Partido Popular).

He made significant changes, cultural, social and economic reforms during his two terms. He established the town's name in Catalan as being "Vila·Nova de Castelló", which years later would be changed by the current United Left of the Valencian Country to "Castelló de la Ribera".
