= Danaé =

1798 painting by Anne-Louis Girodet de Roussy-Trioson

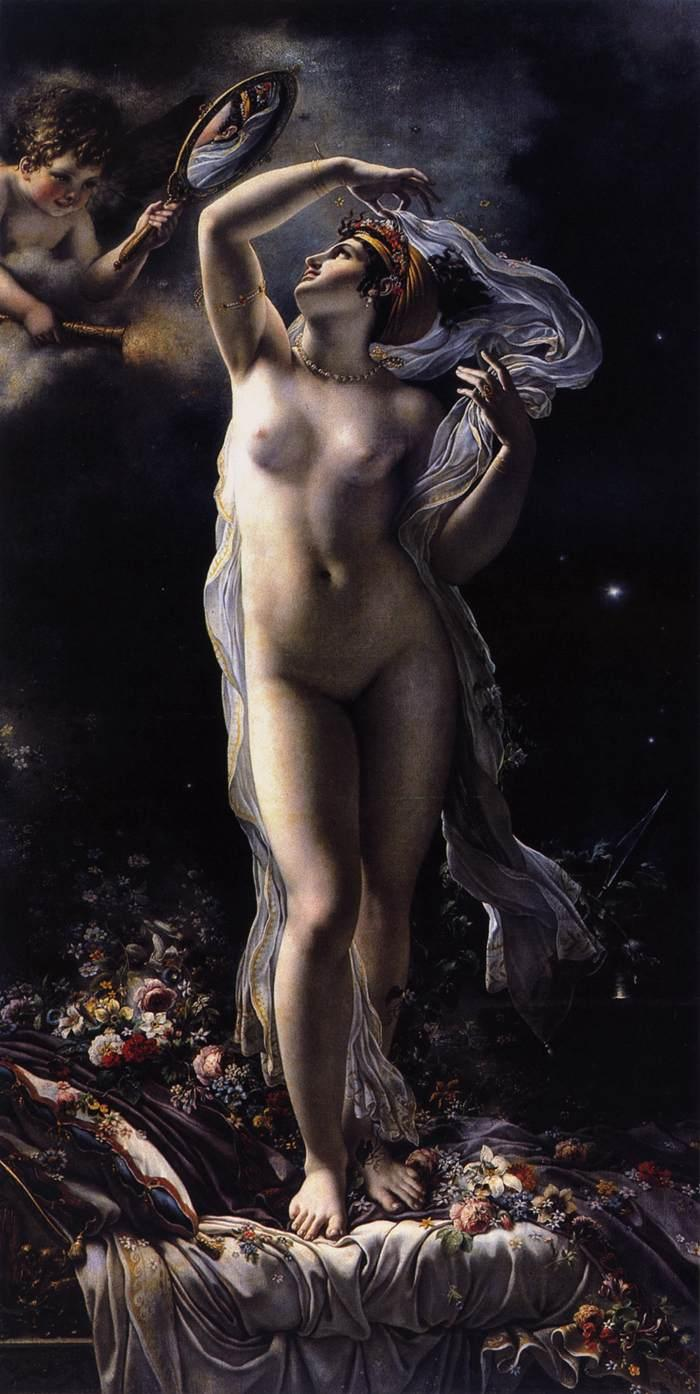
- Artist: Anne-Louis Girodet de Roussy-Trioson
- Year: 1798
- Type: Oil on canvas
- Dimensions: 170 cm × 87.5 cm (67 in × 34.4 in)
- Location: Museum der bildenden Künste; Leipzig

Danaé is an oil painting by French artist Anne-Louis Girodet de Roussy-Trioson depicting the Greek princess Danaë being showered in gifts sent by Zeus. It was commissioned in 1798 to decorate the salon of a Parisian hôtel particulier, and is one of two paintings of Danaë by Girodet, the latter being the satyrical portrait of Mademoiselle Lange as Danaé. Today, the painting is in the collection of the Museum der bildenden Künste in Leipzig.

== History ==
In 1798, Girodet received a commission for a Danaë intended for the interior of Martin Michel Gaudin's hôtel particulier, which was being refurbished at the time, on the rue du Mont-Blanc in the neighbourhood of La Chaussée d'Antin.

Under the ancien régime, La Chaussée d'Antin was a fashionable neighborhood with aristocrats such as Necker and Madame de Montesson as its residents. During the Directory, the neighborhood began to attract members of a newly wealthy bourgeoisie. These new residents sought to align themselves closely with the refinement of the ancien régime, and they commissioned artwork which echoed earlier decorative tendencies. The "hôtel Gaudin" featured interiors inspired by Pompeiian palaces designed by Charles Percier and Pierre Fontaine, both acclaimed decorators during the Revolution and First French Empire.

Like many paintings conceived for decorative purposes, Danaé was not exhibited at the Salon of 1799 and was installed in Gaudin's home immediately after its creation. Girodet earned six hundred francs for Danaé, viewed as a modest payment for the artist. The small amount reflects the limited compensation available to artists under the Directory.

After Gaudin sold the hôtel particulier (the exact date is unknown), a later owner had Danaé’s nudity thickly painted over. Ferdinand Lancrenon, a student of Girodet's, identified the retouching in 1810 and returned the painting to the artist's studio, where its original depiction was restored.

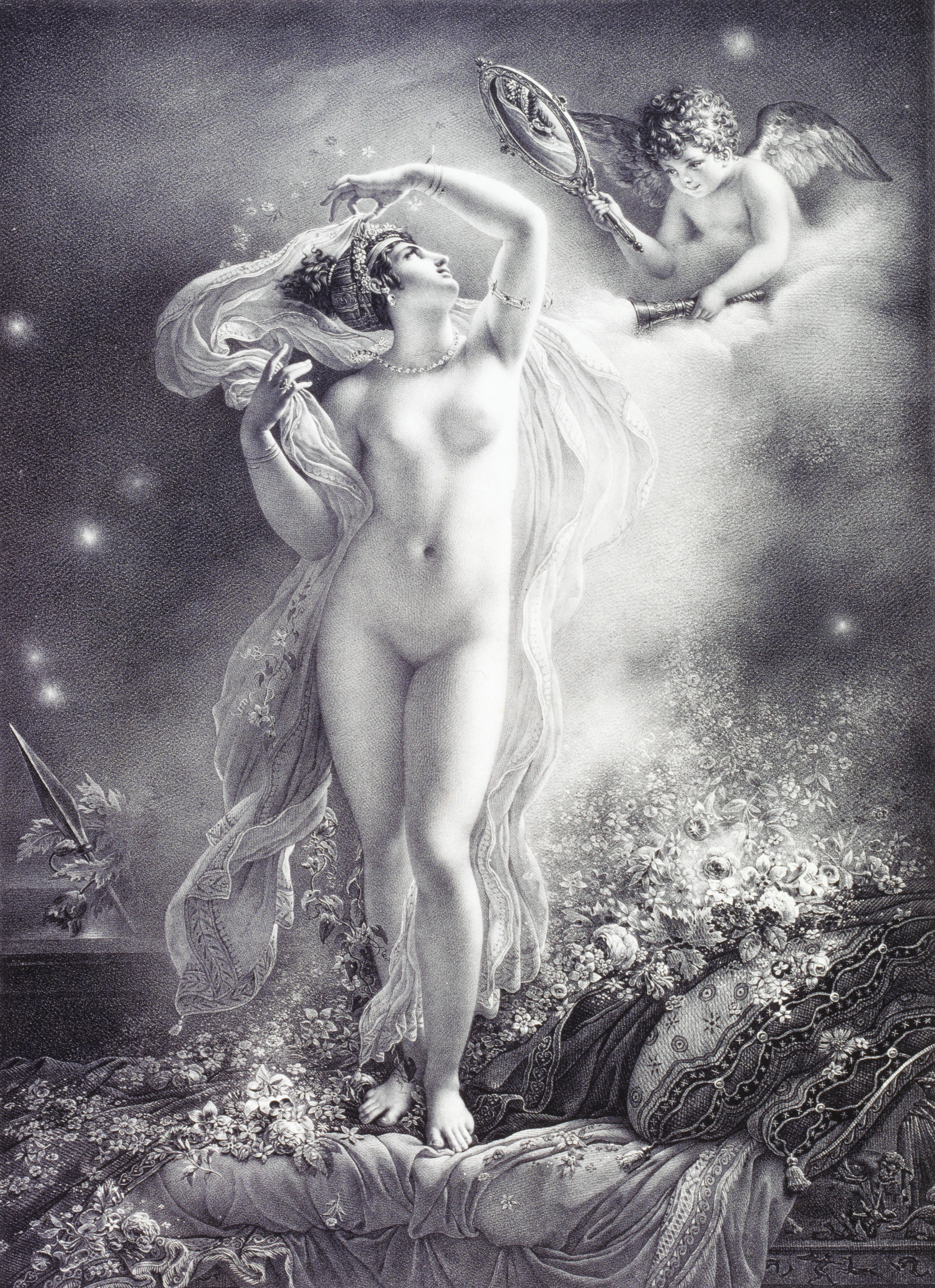
Danaé, lithograph after Girodet by Hyacinthe Audry-Lecomte, 1826. Musée Carnavalet, Paris.

== Description ==
Danaë stands fully exposed on a bed covered in flowers, her pose a gentle contrapposto. Her bed, characteristic of Percier's Pompeiian aesthetic, sits on the top of the tower in which she is kept. The depiction of a guard's spears (visible on the far right by her calf), imply her imprisonment. With arms lifted revealing her chest she looks upwards, caught by her own reflection in a mirror held by a putto. She is unaware of the viewer's presence. Jewels fall from the sky and enlace themselves around her wrist, neck, and arms. A sprinkle of flowers brush her nape as they fall past her and onto her bed. More visible in a lithography of Danaé by Audry-Lecomte (1826), the Perseus constellation alludes to Danaë's mythological progeny, a result of Zeus' material seduction.

== Iconographical analysis ==
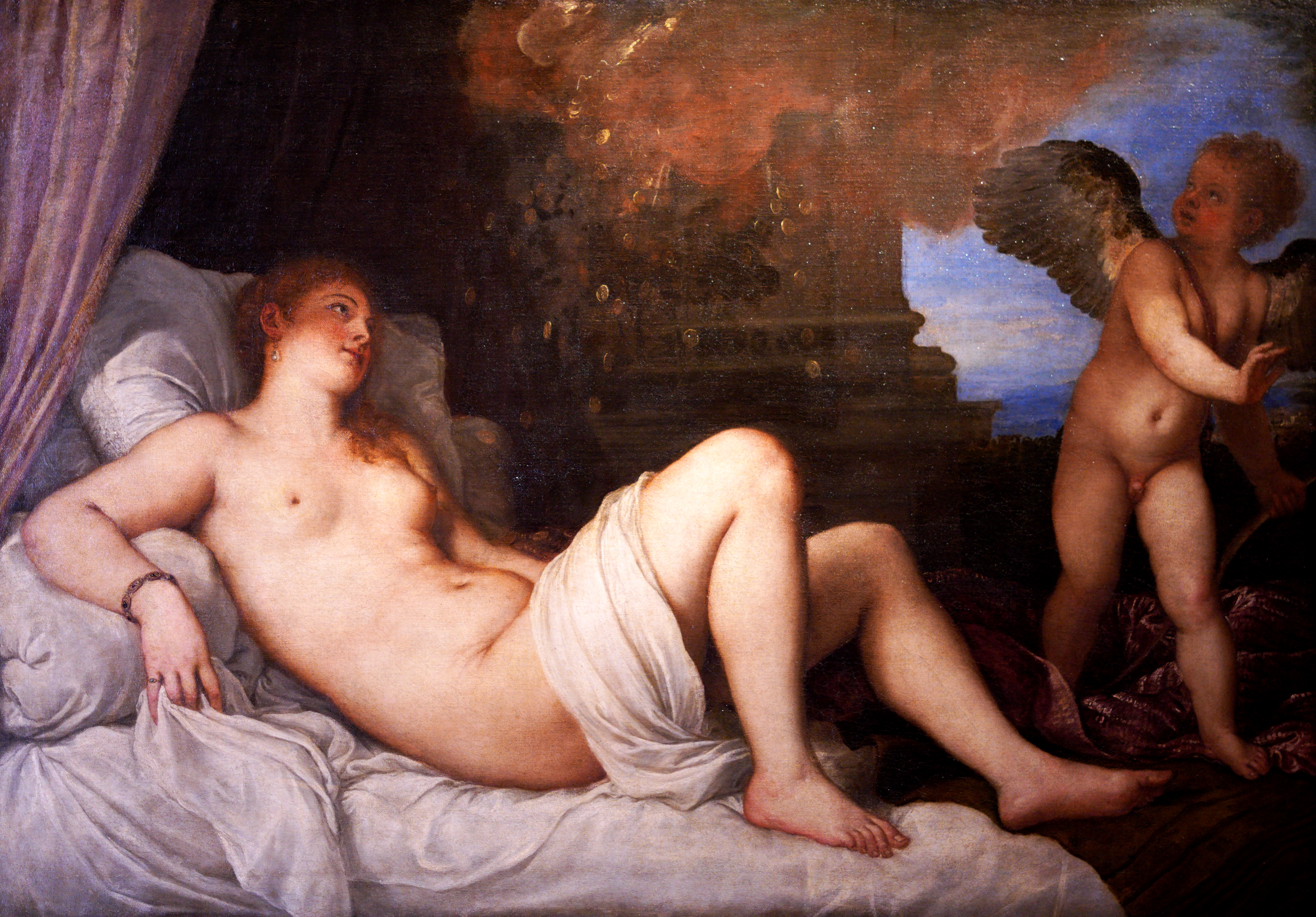
Danaë, Titian, 1542-1543. Oil on canvas. National Museum of Capodimonte, Naples

With Danaé, Girodet made a return to mythological allegory, having previously earned acclaim for Endymion Asleep (1791).

The Dictionnaire des Fables, an encyclopedia of allegorical figures published in 1801, criticized the subject of Danaë as worn out and notes it as having inspired a fresh angle of the subject in the young artist:

"Ce sujet [Danaé], tout usé qu'il est dans la poésie et la peinture, a fourni des idées nouvelles à un jeune artiste de la plus grande espérance, le citoyen Girodet"

Girodet's interpretation of Danaë differs from canonical conceptions of the myth, such as Titian's, in which the figure is shown reclining beneath the shower of gold. In contrast, Girodet depicts her standing, a pose that some scholars compare to a Venus Anadyomene. Scholars analyzing the historical representation of Danaë have found that she was represented as standing in the antiquity, as can be seen in jewelry of the early classical Greek period, so it is believed that Girodet used an antique style of depicting Danaë to compliment with the Pompeiian aesthetics of the hôtel Gaudin's interiors.

Pierre-Alexandre Coupin's description of the painting in his publication on Girodet (1829) served to decode many of the unconventional elements in the artist's treatment of the subject.

== Bibliography ==
- Bellenger, Sylvain. Girodet 1767-1824. Gallimard, 2005
- Lippert, Sarah. The Iconography of Endymion during the French Revolution. Boydell & Brewer, Camden House, 2017
- Coupin, Pierre-Alexandre. Œuvres posthumes de Girodet-Trioson, peintre d'histoire: suivies de sa correspondence. J. Renouard, 1829
- Lafont, Anne. À La Recherche D'une Iconographie "Incroyable" et "Merveilleuse": Les Panneaux Décoratifs Sous le Directoire". LES ARTS ET LA RÉVOLUTION, 2005.
- Levitine, George. Girodet-Trioson: An Iconographical Study. Garland, 1978.
- Massonaud, Dominique . Le nu moderne au salon (1799-1853): revue de presse. ELLUG, 2005.
- Noël, François. Dictionnaire de la Fable. Le Normant, 1801.
- Porzio, Domenico. Lithography: 200 years of art, history & technique. H.N Abrams, 1983
- Sluijter, Eric Jan. Emulating Sensual Beauty: Representations of Danaë from Gossaert to Rembrandt. Quarterly for the History of Art, 1999
