= Jean-François Gilles Colson =

French painter (1733–1803)

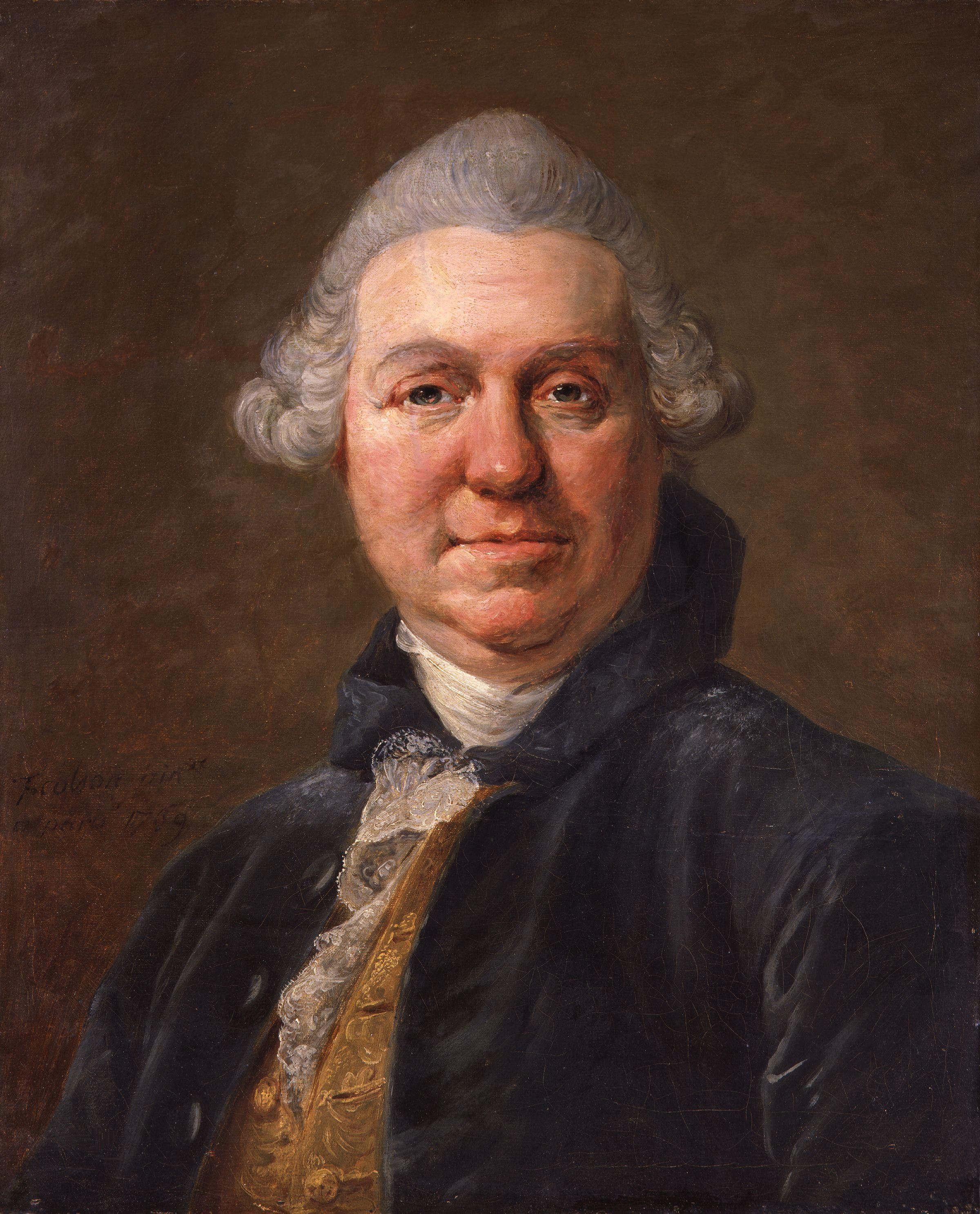
Portrait of Samuel Foote, now in the National Portrait Gallery in London.

Jean-François Gilles Colson (1733–1803) was a French painter.

He was born in Dijon in 1733, the son of Jean-Baptiste Gilles. He was a pupil of his father, of Frère Imbert at Avignon, and of Nonotte at Lyons.

On coming to Paris he was presented to the Duke of Bouillon, who kept him in constant employment for forty years as architect, sculptor, painter, and even gardener. He gained a reputation as a portrait painter, and left several manuscripts on perspective, poetry, and the fine arts. He died in Paris in 1803.
