= Pension Belhomme =

Prison and private clinic during the French Revolution

Coordinates: 48.8569°N 2.3892°E

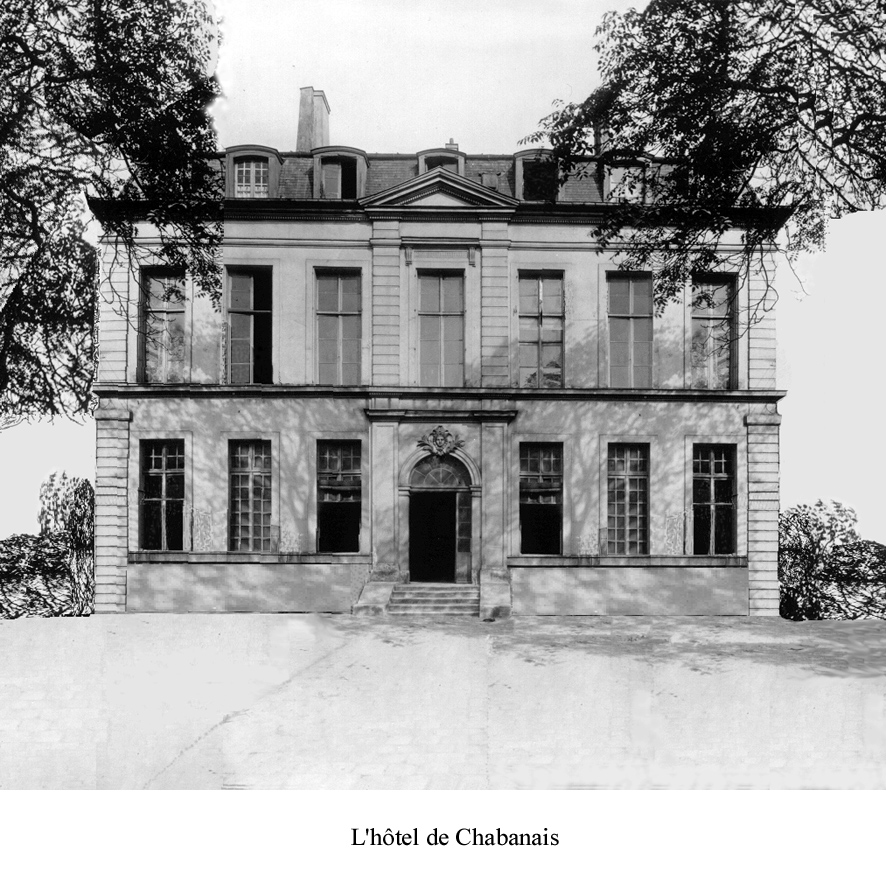
The Hôtel de Chabanais

The Pension Belhomme was a prison and private clinic during the French Revolution in the Rue de Charonne (11e arrondissement, Paris).

Around 1765, the joiner Jacques Belhomme took on the construction of a building for the son of a neighbour, an aristocrat who had been mad since birth. Seeing that running an asylum was more lucrative than joinery, he opened an asylum for lunatics, old people and whoever else rich families wanted to entrust to him. A famous precursor of psychiatry, Philippe Pinel, carried out his first treatments of the insane here.

Once the French Revolution had begun, Jacques Belhomme thought that his fortune was assured. Remote from the violent centre of Paris, he had noticeable advantages. In September 1793, when the Reign of Terror began, the députés encouraged the sans-culottes to imprison all suspect individuals: nobles, their wives and children, foreigners, priests, lawyers, the actors of the Comédie Française, rich people in general, in short, all those who had not made clear their allegiance to the Republic. With the prisons of Paris already overflowing, the state requisitioned Belhomme's asylum and then all other private clinics. Belhomme entreated the 12 police chiefs in charge of Paris to send him rich prisoners who would pay high fees to live in his asylum as comfortably as possible. From then on marquises, bankers, journalists, famous actors, old nobles and army officers, along with other disgraced persons who bribed the doctors and police chiefs to be transferred on the pretext of illness, lived cheek by jowl with the mad.

Belhomme rented the neighbouring building, the hôtel de Chabanais, to which he linked his own building by a charming garden after the young marquis de Chabanais, a descendant of Colbert, had emigrated with his mother and had his possessions confiscated by the state. Belhomme ended up buying the house to invest the money he had made. It was in this setting that there occurred the romance between Jacques-Marie Rouzet, a deputy to the National Convention, and Louise Marie Adélaïde de Bourbon, widow of the Duc d’Orléans and mother of the future King Louis-Philippe. They married in secret after leaving prison.

The scandal of the Pension Belhomme finally erupted in January 1794. Belhomme was arrested for supplying wine to the inmates and was imprisoned in another pension, at Coignard, where the Marquis de Sade was also held. He was found guilty twice and, like the majority of the former inmates of his "clinic", escaped the guillotine only because the Terror ended on 9 Thermidor. Some of the former inmates did not escape, however, proving too well known to pass unnoticed. They included Béatrice de Choiseul-Stainville, duchesse de Gramont, sister of Louis XV's famous minister; the duchess of Le Châtelet, daughter-in-law of a famous mistress of Voltaire, the fermier général Magon de La Balue, guillotined with his children, grandchildren, great-grandchildren, brothers and cousins; and the lawyer Simon-Nicholas Henri Linguet, despite his denunciation of the monarchy, for which he had spent a year in the Bastille under the ancien regime.

The hôtel de Chabanais was razed in 1953, as was the maison Belhomme in 1973.

== Bibliography ==
- Frédéric Lenormand, La pension Belhomme, une prison de luxe sous la Terreur, Paris, Fayard, 2002.
