= Jacques Belhomme =

French pension owner (1737–1824)

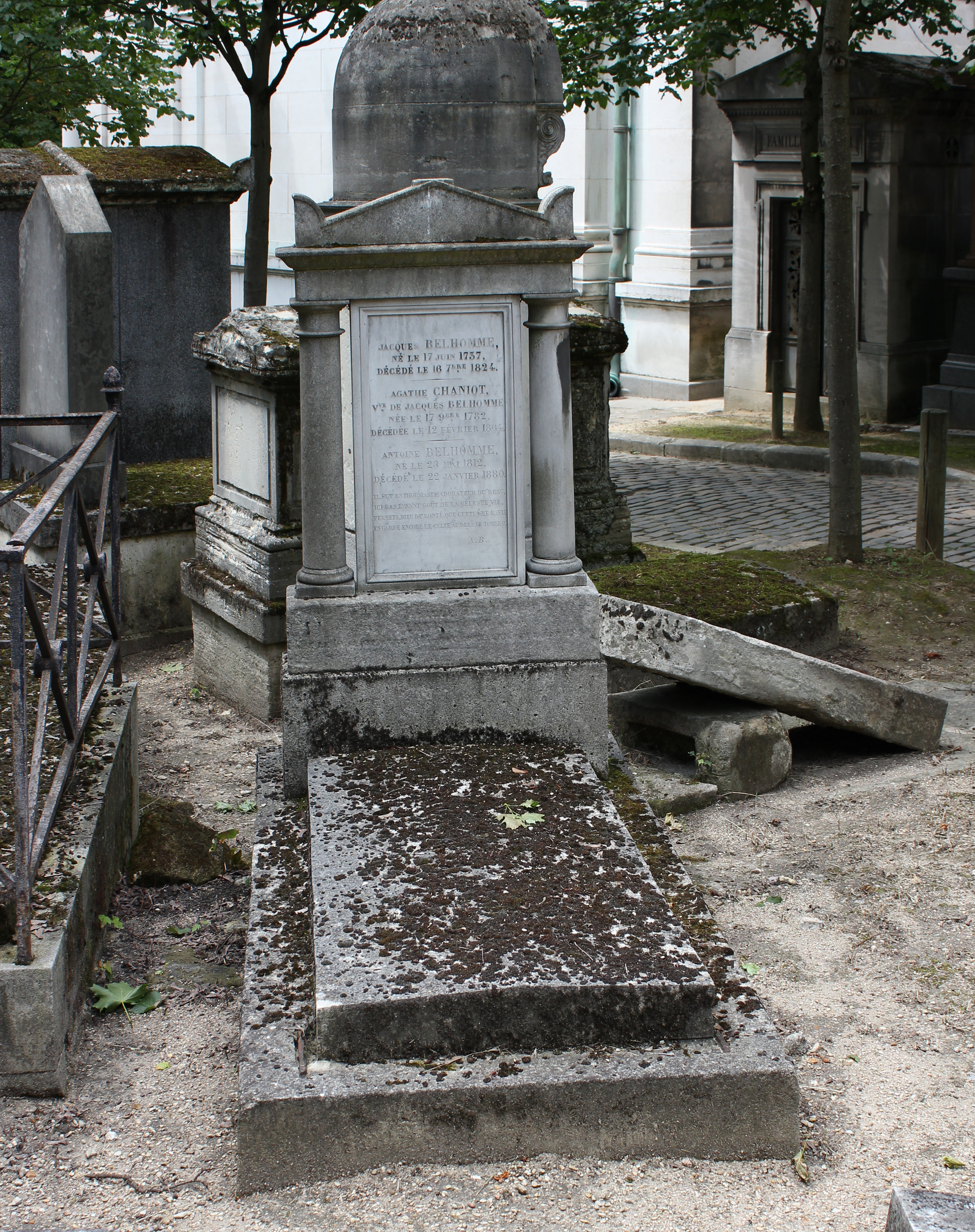
- Belhomme's grave in Père Lachaise Cemetery
- Born: 17 June 1737
- Died: 16 September 1824 (aged 87)
- Occupation: Doctor

Jacques Belhomme (17 June 1737 – 16 September 1824) was a personality of the French Revolution and the owner of the Pension Belhomme in Paris. He appears as a character in the 1951 film Darling Caroline, based on the novel by Jacques Laurent.

== Life ==
A joiner in the village of Charonne, he was made the holder of the "pension bourgeoise", precursor to the clinics and rest homes of today. He then became a gaoler when the Jacobins sent prisoners there from the end of 1793.

Belhomme gained fame for a scandal that broke out just after his death, when the comte de Sainte-Aulaire prepared a press article accusing Belhomme of having profited from the Reign of Terror to ransom rich suspects. As ever, the reality was more subtle.

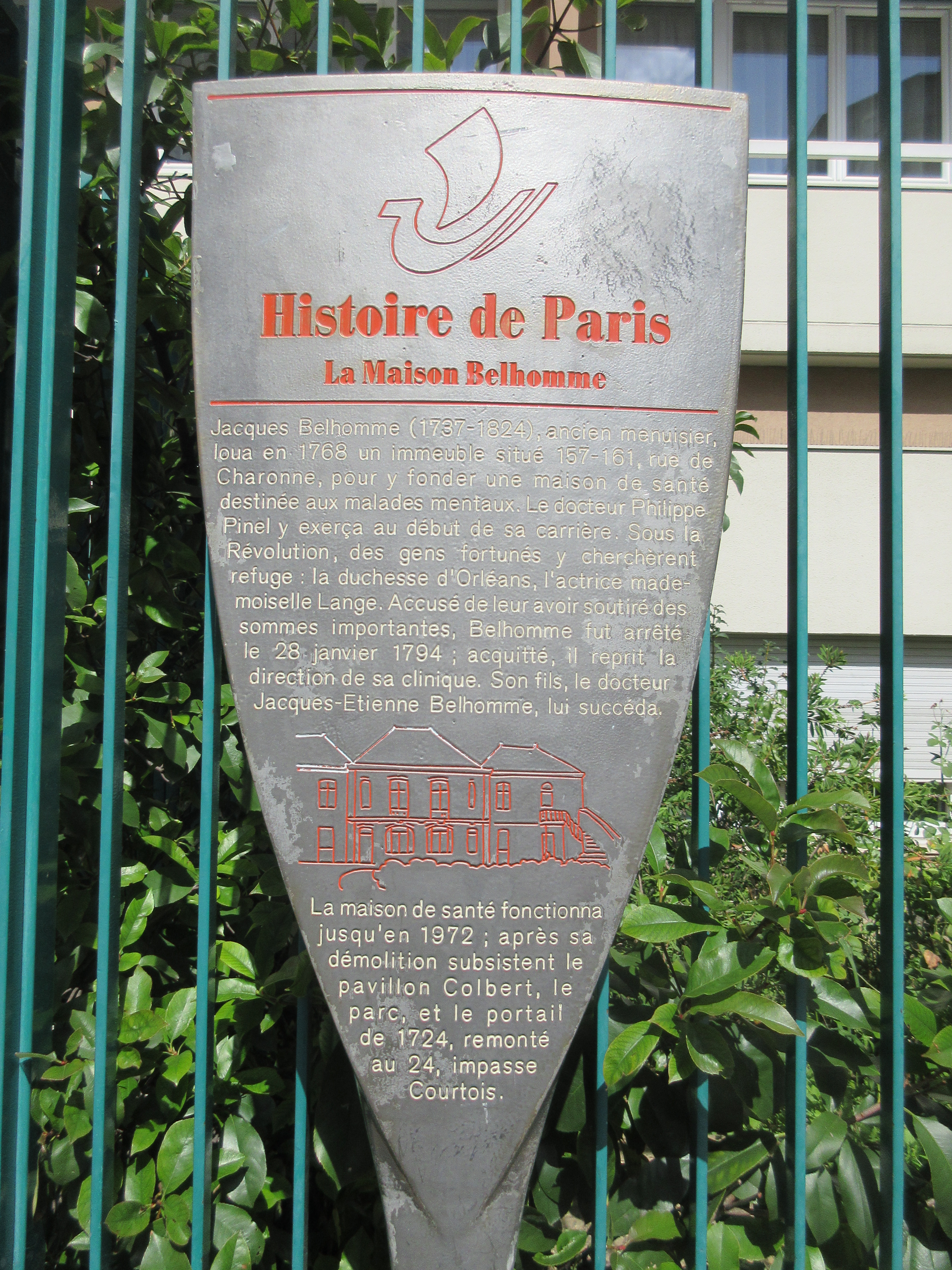
Panneau Maison Belhomme

== Bibliography ==
- Frédéric Lenormand, La pension Belhomme, une prison de luxe sous la Terreur, Paris, Fayard, 2002.
