= Adrien Manglard =

French landscape painter and engraver ( 1695 – 1760)

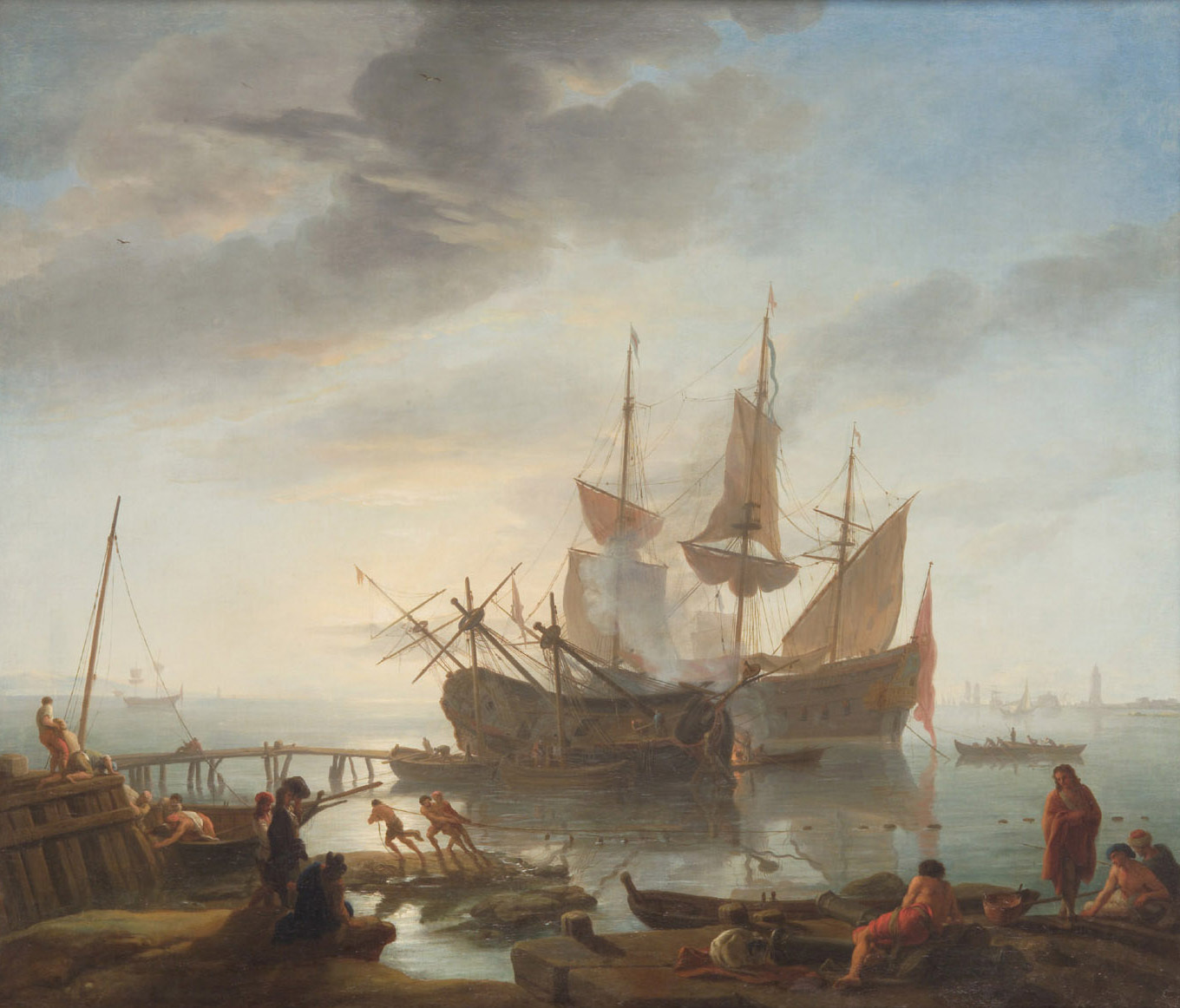
- Seestück, Kunsthistorisches Museum
- Born: March 10, 1695; Lyon, Lyonnais, Kingdom of France
- Died: August 1, 1760 (aged 65); Rome, Papal States
- Education: Adriaen van der Cabel; Académie royale de peinture et de sculpture; Accademia di San Luca; Accademia di Belle Arti dei Virtuosi al Pantheon
- Known for: Landscape painting
- Patrons: Pierre Le Gros the Younger (1666–1719); Victor Amadeus II of Sardinia (1666–1732); Philip, Duke of Parma (1720–1765); Chigi family Colonna family Orsini family Rondani family Rospigliosi family

Adrien Manglard (French pronunciation: [adʁijɛ̃ mɑ̃ɡlaʁ]; 10 March 1695 – 1 August 1760) was a French painter, draughtsman, and engraver. He was a skilled marine painter, who was able to rapidly advance his career in Rome thanks to his compositional skills, selling paintings to clients such as the Rospigliosi family, Victor Amadeus II, King of Sardinia, and Philip, the Duke of Parma. The latter alone commissioned more than 140 paintings from Manglard.

The son of a modest painter, Manglard was trained in Lyon by his godson Adriaen van der Cabel, a Dutch Golden Age landscapist. In 1734 Manglard was admitted to the Académie Royale de Peinture et de Sculpture, which he entered as a full member in 1736. In his youth he traveled to Rome, where he spent most of his life. He is said to have trained under Bernardino Fergioni (1674–1738) in Italy. Manglard also came into contact with artists in the circle of sculptor Pierre Le Gros the Younger (1666–1719), who commissioned two paintings from him before 1719.

Manglard's best known pupil is arguably Claude-Joseph Vernet, who, upon his arrival in Rome, was welcomed by Manglard into his studio and initiated into seascape painting by him and Fergioni.

Once concentrated in Rome, his work is today spread across private and institutional collections around the world. Manglard is also known for his mural painting. He painted the frescoes of two rooms in the Palazzo Chigi in Rome, including the Sala delle Marine.

== Life ==
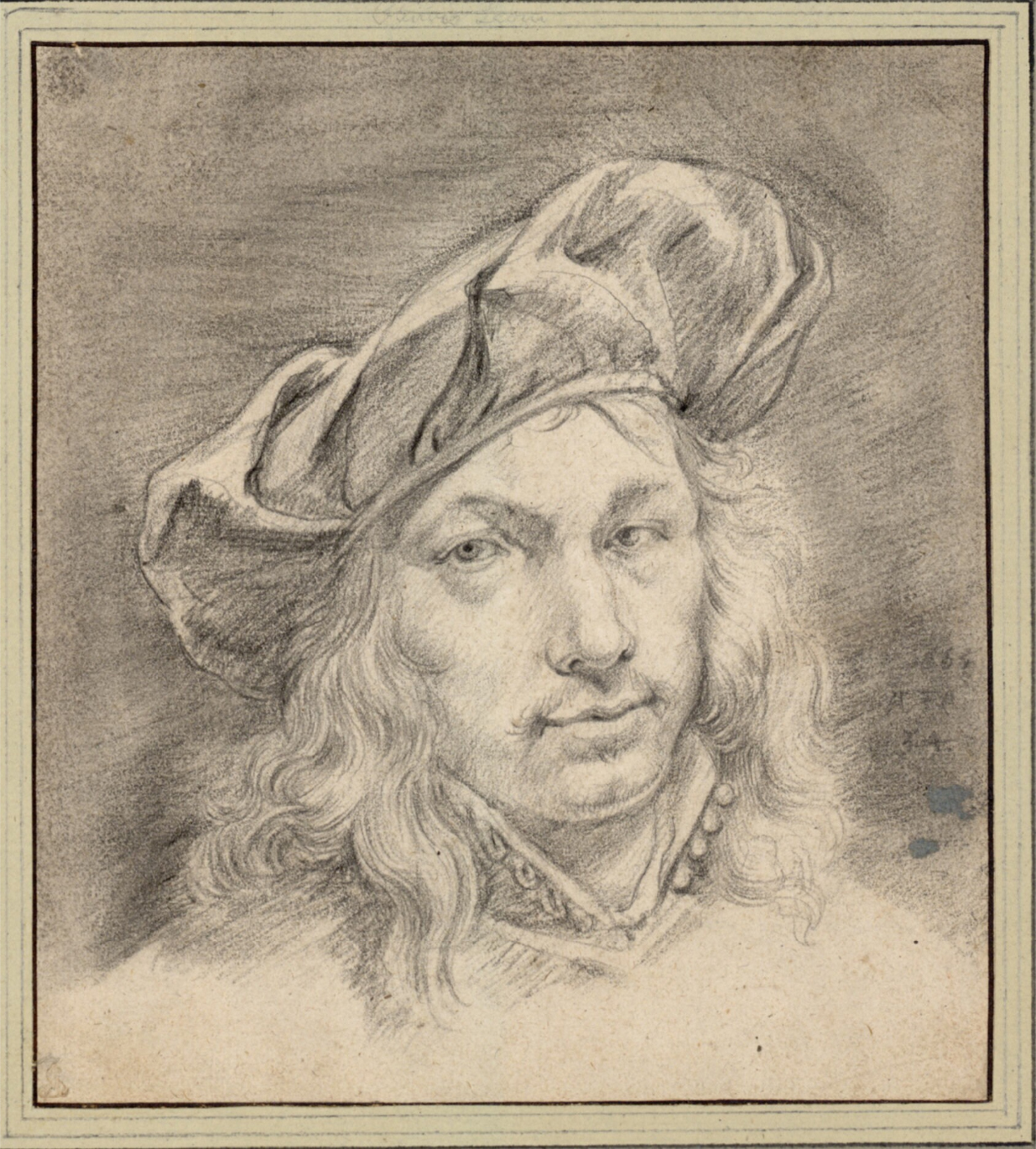
Manglard's first master, Adriaen van der Cabel

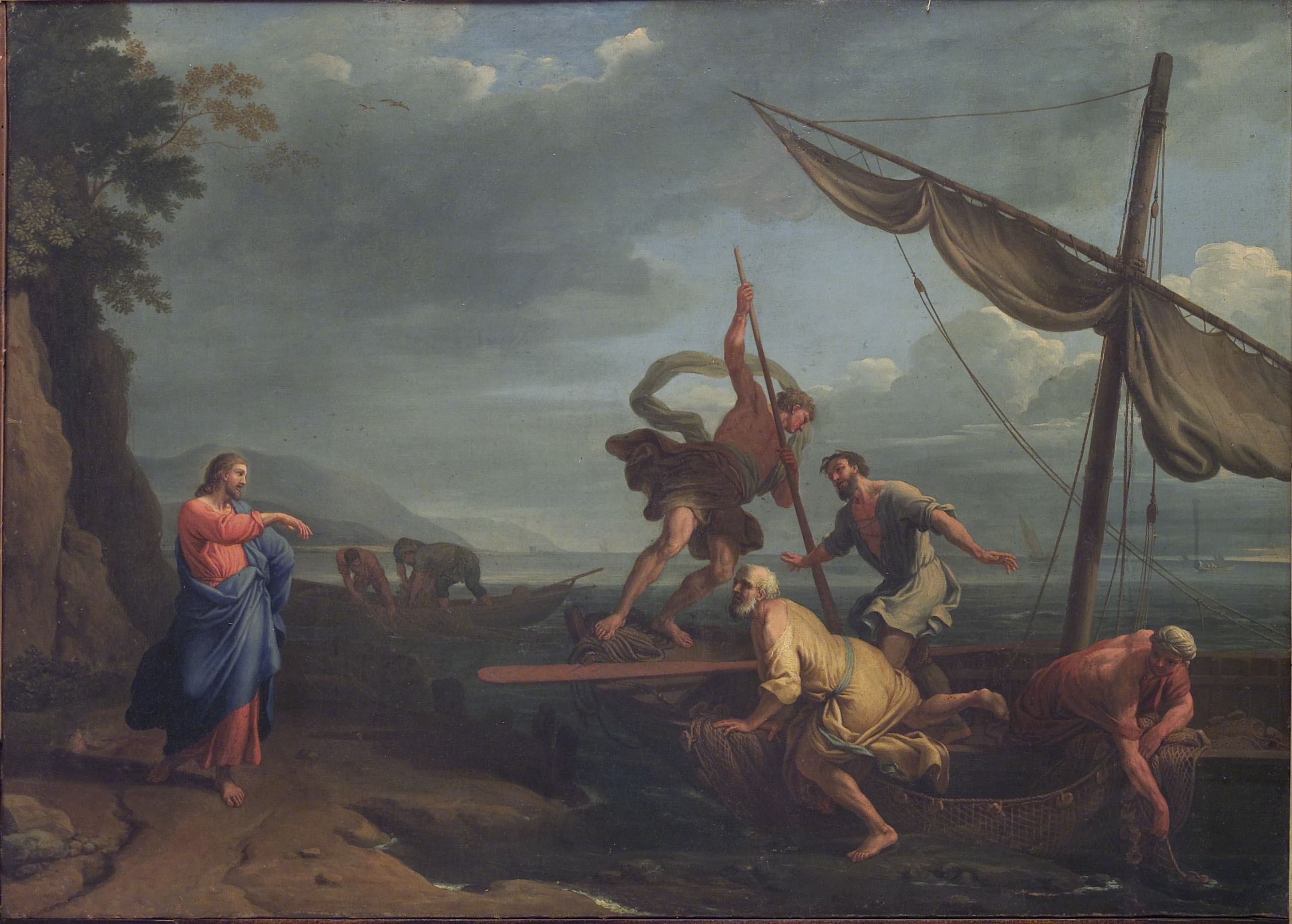
An example of Manglard's figure painting

Adrien Manglard was born on 10 March 1695 in the city of Lyon, Kingdom of France, the firstborn of Edmond (called Aimé) Manglard and Catherine Rose du Perrier (or Dupérier). He was baptized in the church of Saint-Vincent on March 12 of the same year.

Manglard's father was a modest painter originally from Paris, the son of Jean Manglard, a Parisian bourgeois, and lady Anne Alliot. Manglard's mother was the daughter of Antoine Dupérier, a bookseller and merchant, and Esprite de Tassi. Both Manglard's parents lost their fathers at a young age. Dupérier's mother later remarried to local painter Pierre Savournin, to whom Jean Manglard asked for her hand.

His parents were married on 21 May 1693 in the Basilica of Saint-Martin d'Ainay. Beside Adrien they had two other children, Pierre, born 1700, and Daniel, born in 1702. His family suffered the economic repercussions of the famine caused by the Little Ice Age's extremely cold weather, which led to the seven ill years in Scotland and the remarkably cold Le Grand Hiver in France, with the subsequent famine estimated to have caused 600,000 deaths by the end of 1710 in France. In 1707, Manglard's two brothers Pierre and Daniel were left at the Hôpital de la Charité, an orphanage in Lyon, to which they were admitted as délaissés (abandoned).

Manglard studied under Adriaen van der Cabel in Lyon. Van der Cabel was a Dutch Golden Age landscapist and a pupil of Jan van Goyen who, like Manglard, traveled to Rome in his youth, where he sojourned from 1656 to 1674—his Dutch style coming under the influence of the Romano-Bolognese landscape painting. As a student of van der Cabel, Manglard was influenced by the Dutch Golden age landscape painting, as well as the Italianized Dutch painting style typical of the seventeenth century.

Manglard later moved from Lyon to Marseille, or Avignon, where he studied under the Carthusian painter Joseph Gabriel Imbert (1666–1749), a relatively unknown master of whom today but a few biographical anecdotes and two paintings (a copy of Guido Reni's Annunciazione and a large landscape painting depicting the Flight into Egypt) survive. Manglard learned figure painting with Imbert.

At some point in the 1710s (probably around 1715) Manglard moved to Rome, where he was to spend most of his life and career. While the exact date of Manglard's arrival in Rome is unknown, this certainly took place before 1722. A painting by Manglard dated 1722 (a seascape drawing "touched by strokes of a pen and watercolor, one braccio and 1/6 wide, 15 soldi high, depicting both ships and figures") was once at the Gabburri Gallery in Florence. The painting is now lost. Rome based sculptor Pierre Le Gros acquired six marine views by Manglard. Le Gros died in 1719, which makes these six seascapes the earliest documented paintings by Manglard.

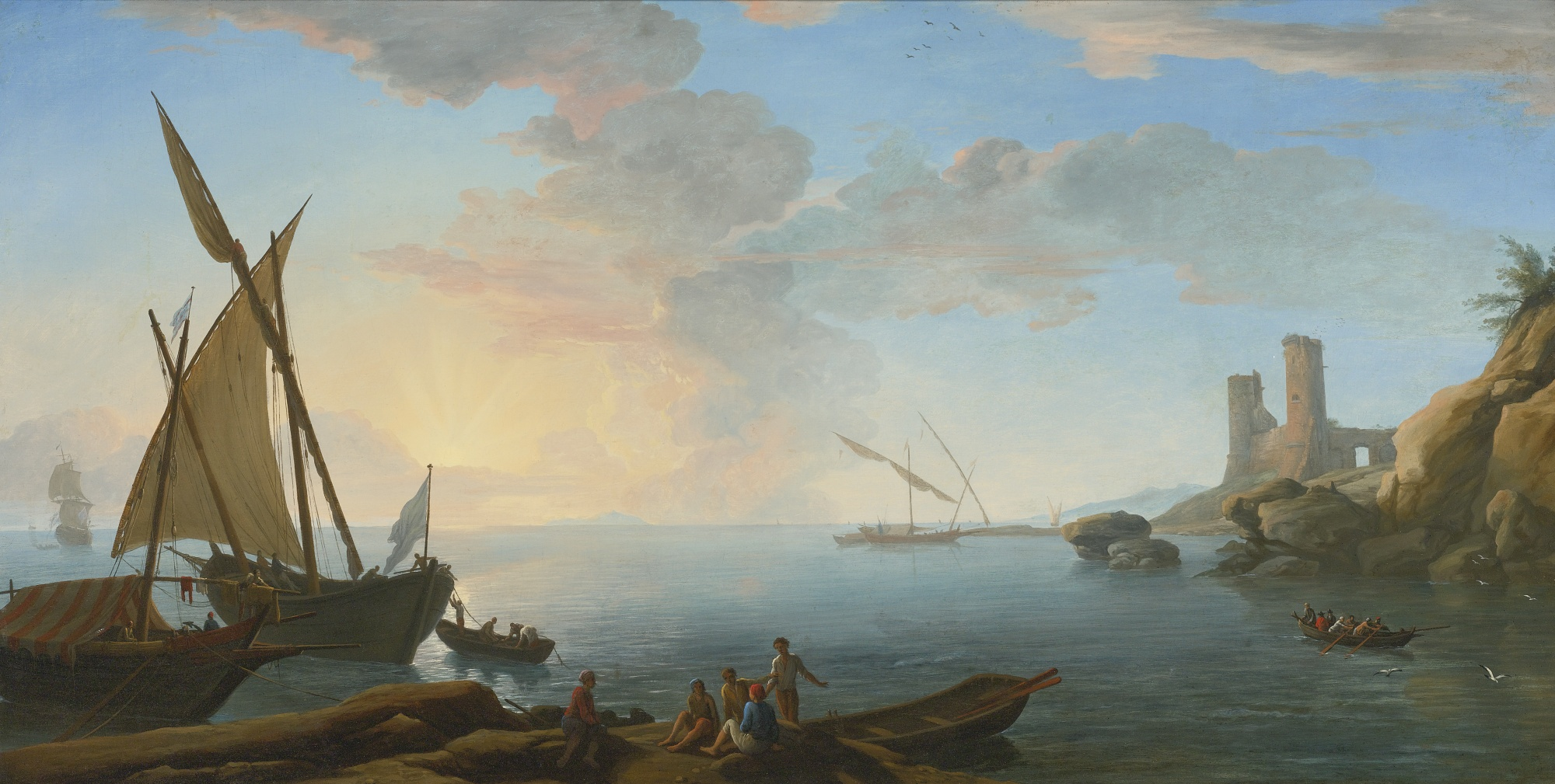
An example of Manglard's early work in Rome

Manglard came to Rome simply as a "tourist"; he wasn't under the protection of the French Academy, which would welcome him as a full member in 1736. In 1722 he was probably already enjoying some degree of fame in Rome. Manglard started to enjoy the patronage of notable commissioners at least since the mid-1720s. In the 1720s he started working for the Corte Sabauda, to which he sent two paintings from Rome in 1726. Manglard's talent as a marine painter "was such that his career advanced rapidly: prestigious clients included Victor Amadeus II, Duke of Savoy and King of Piedmont, who bought two matching pieces from him in 1726 (Turin, Galleria Sabauda), and Philip, Duke of Parma." Philip alone commissioned more than 140 paintings from Manglard to decorate his palaces. Manglard also enjoyed the patronage of the most important Roman families, including the Colonna, the Orsini, the Rondani, the Rospigliosi and the Chigi. For the Chigi he frescoed two rooms on the piano nobile of the Palazzo Chigi, today the official residence of the Prime Minister of Italy.

On 8 June 1728 Catherine Rose du Perrier, Manglard's mother, died in Avignon. Manglard presumably went back to Avignon on this occasion. The same year, his brother Daniel left for Martinique. Three years later, Manglard's father Edmond left France forever.

After a career in Italy which spanned over forty years, Manglard died in Rome on 1 August 1760.

Beside being a painter, Manglard was also an art collector. In January 1761, Rome notary J. L. Vannoi drew up the inventory for Manglard's collection. Manglard's universal successor was his brother Pierre, then resident in Paris.

== Work ==
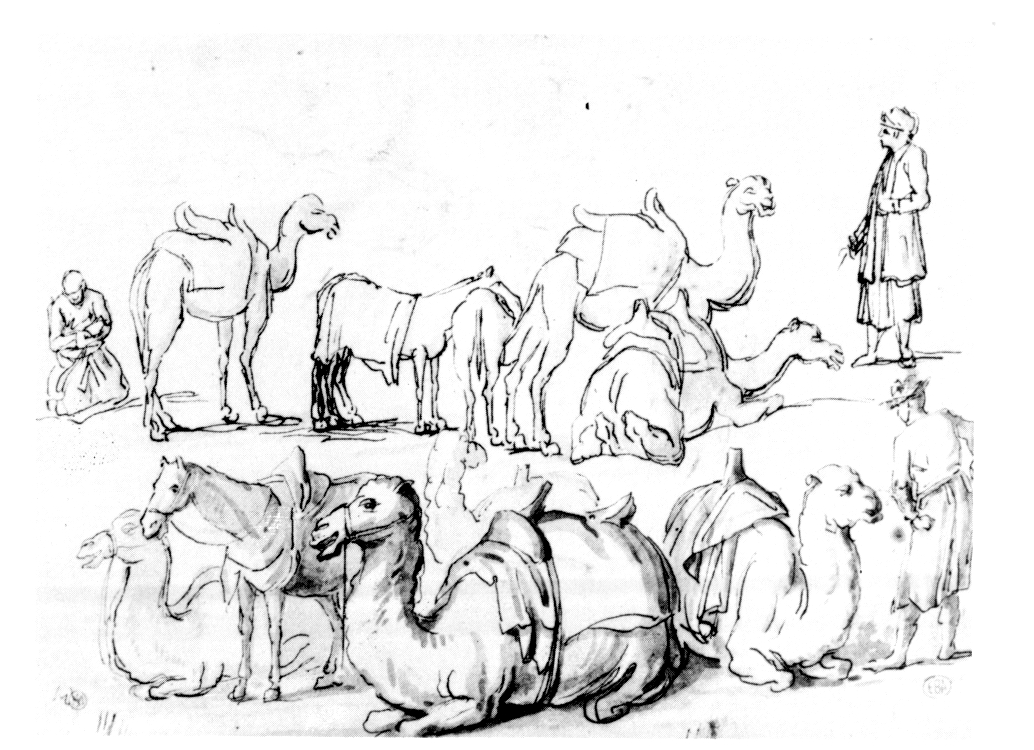
Study of camels, Paris, École des Beaux-Arts

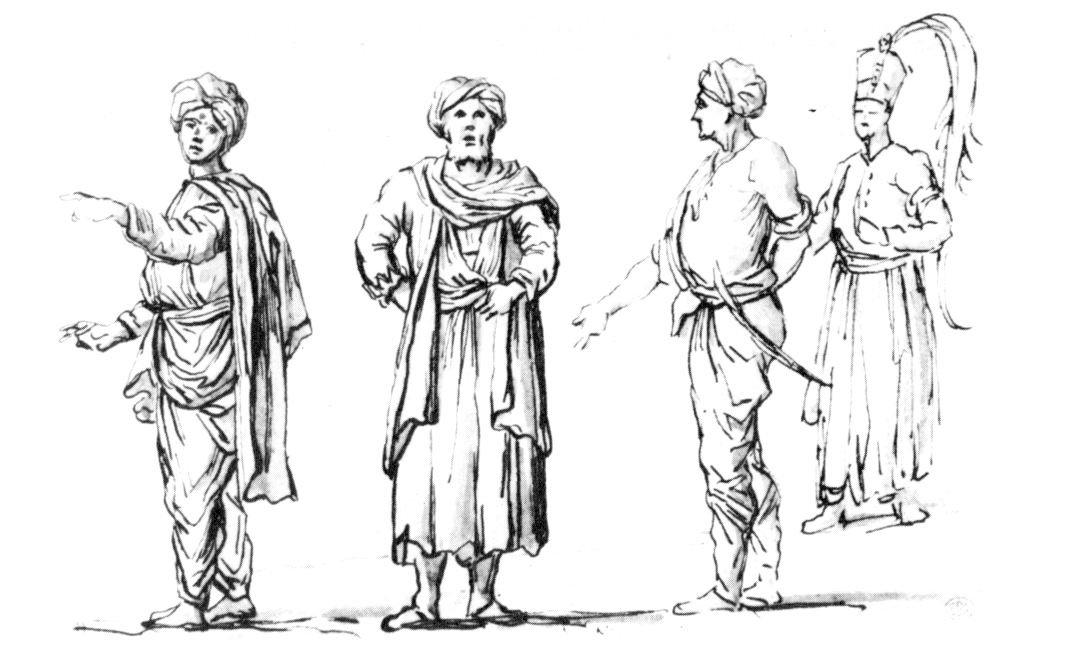
Study of figures, Paris, École des Beaux-Arts

After a brief period of employment in France, where he devoted himself to studying under van der Cabel and Frère Imbert, Manglard moved to Rome.

One of his earliest known Roman works (setting 1722, at least, as a terminus post quem for his arrival in the Italian capital; although Le Gros is known to have acquired six paintings from Manglard before his own demise in 1719) is a drawing once housed at the Galleria Gabburri in Florence, now lost. The drawing in chalk, pen and watercolor was commissioned by Niccolò Gabburri himself, and depicted a seascape with both figures and ships (Disegno d'una marina, toccata di penna e acquerelli; per traverso lunga un braccio e 1/6, alta soldi 15, con quantità di navi e figure. Di mano di monsù Adriano Manglard di Lione di Francia, fatto in Roma apposta per questo studio l'anno 1722).

In Rome, Manglard reportedly studied with Bernardino Fergioni before quickly rising to fame as a landscape painter. Before 1722 he was already relatively known in Rome.

Manglard was trained by a Dutch Golden Age landscapist, who had himself traveled to Italy. There, his master's style was influenced by the local Romano-Bolognese school. Manglard thus came into contact firstly with the Dutch Golden age landscape painting style with the due amount of Italian influence of Cabel, to then actually move to Italy himself in his early twenties, and be therein influenced by the prominent Rome based painters of the day, including artists in the circle of sculptor Pierre Legros, such as Sebastiano Conca and Caspar van Wittel. Manglard's marine paintings combine "the idealized, classical landscapes of Claude Lorrain with the acute realism of Northern models."

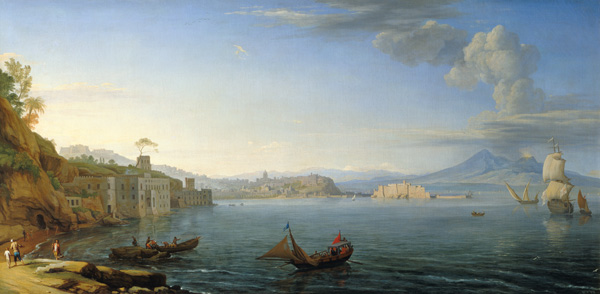
View of Naples, Schloss Rohrau

Manglard focused on what would become his field of expertise in Rome, that is marine views. He made studies of ships, Turks and even camels. Manglard often depicted ports and harbours in his seascape. Figures such as Moors and camels, which appear frequently in his paintings, reflect the exoticism of the great Italian harbors.

Venice's harbour was once the gates to the Orient. However, the northern Italian city hardly appears in Manglard's oeuvre. Naples, on the other hand, which is very close to Rome, figures frequently in Manglard. Manglard depicted the Vesuvio on at least three occasions.

Manglard's most notable student in Rome was arguably Claude-Joseph Vernet, who hailed from Avignon. Manglard, together with Bernardino Fergioni, initiated him into seascape painting. According to some authors, both Vernet and Manglard eclipsed their master, Fergioni. According to the same authors, Vernet had in turn a more "subtle grace and spirit" than his master, who presented a sound, firm, natural and harmonizing taste ("... Il suo nome [Bernardino Fergioni's] fu dopo non molti anni oscurato da due franzesi, Adriano Manglard, di un gusto sodo, naturale, accordato; e il suo allievo, Giuseppe Vernet, di una vaghezza e di uno spirito superiore al maestro").

== Gallery ==
Selected paintings

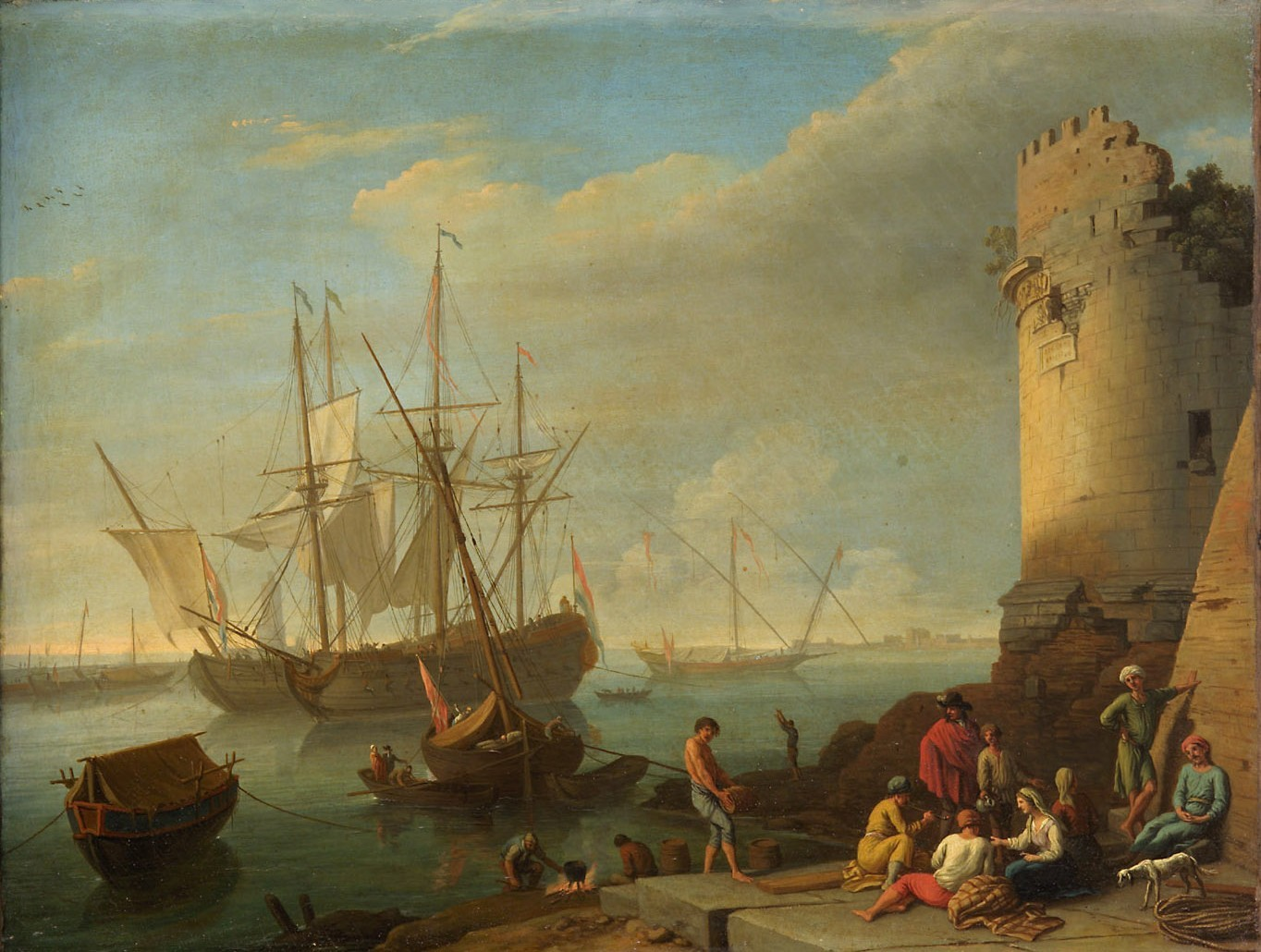
Seehafen, Kunsthistorisches Museum, Vienna

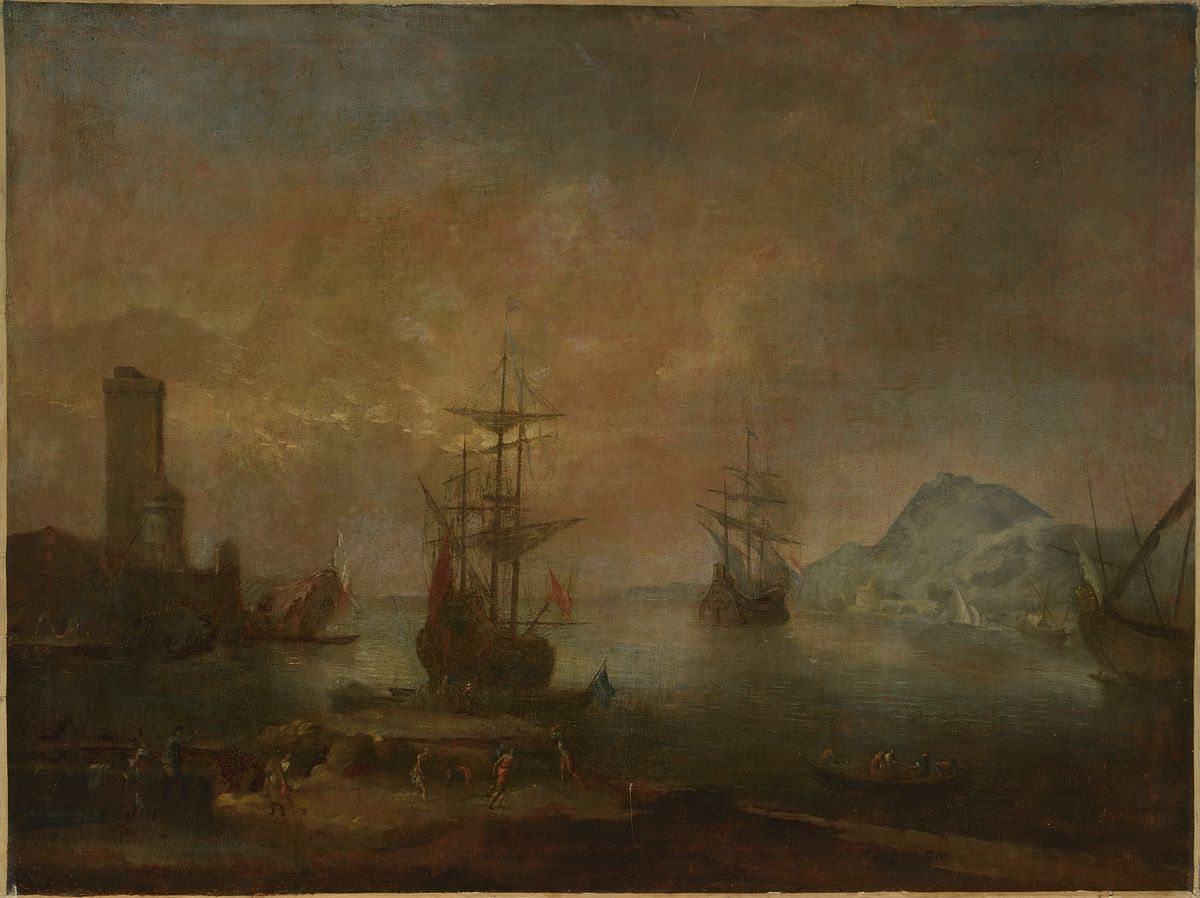
Marine, Museum of Fine Arts, Lyon

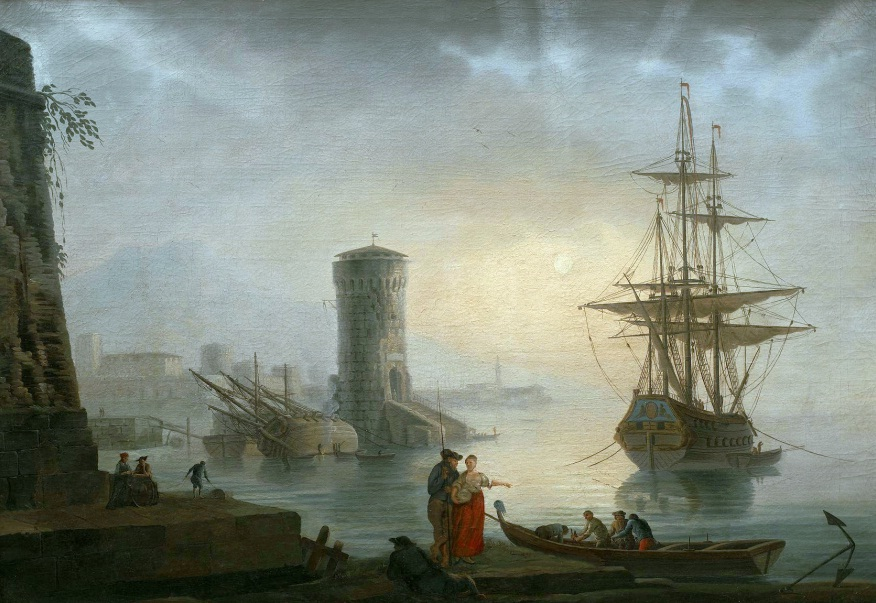
Mediterranean Port, King John III Palace Museum, Warsaw

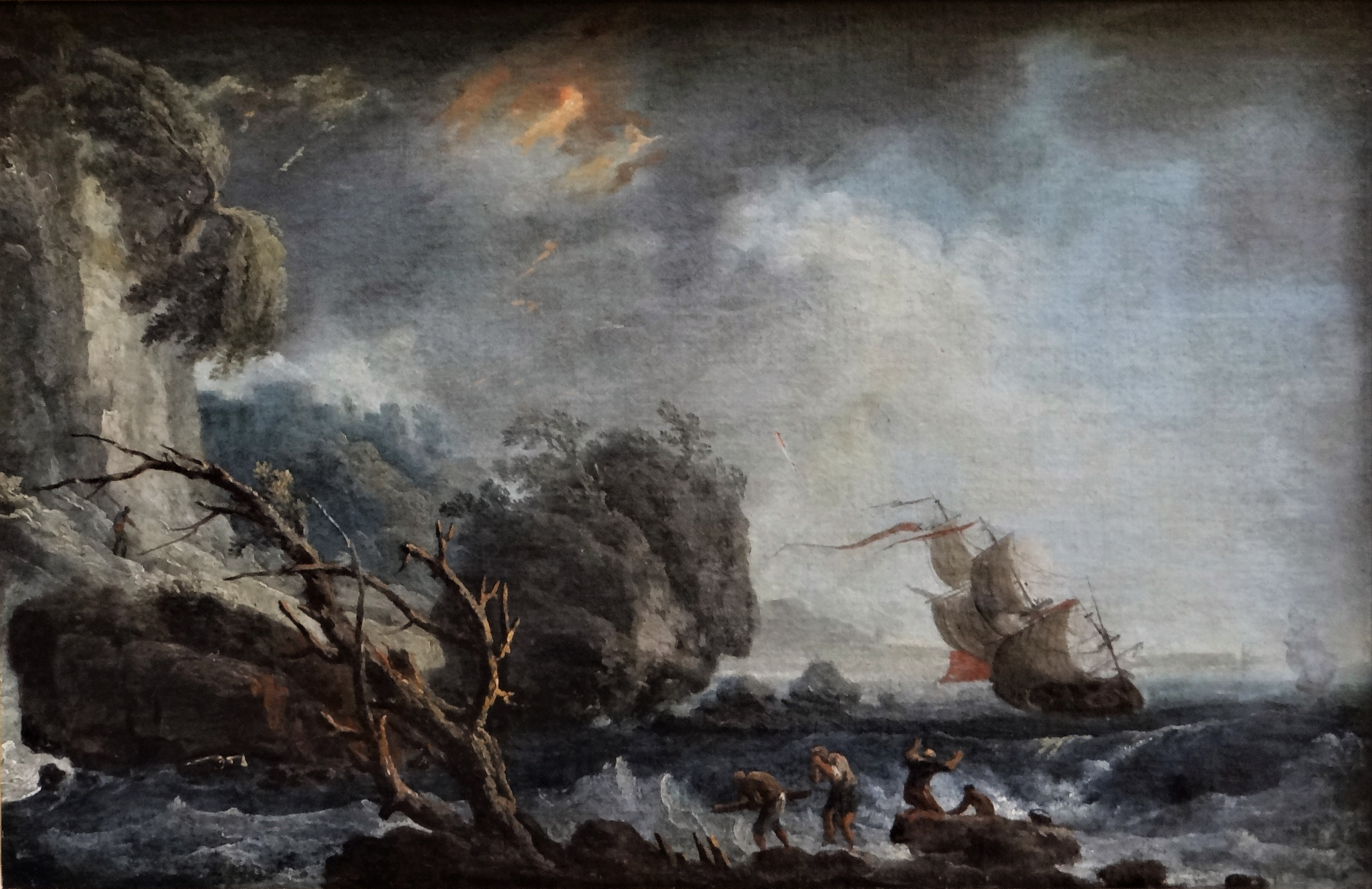
The End of the Storm, Museum of Art and Archeology of Périgord, Périgueux

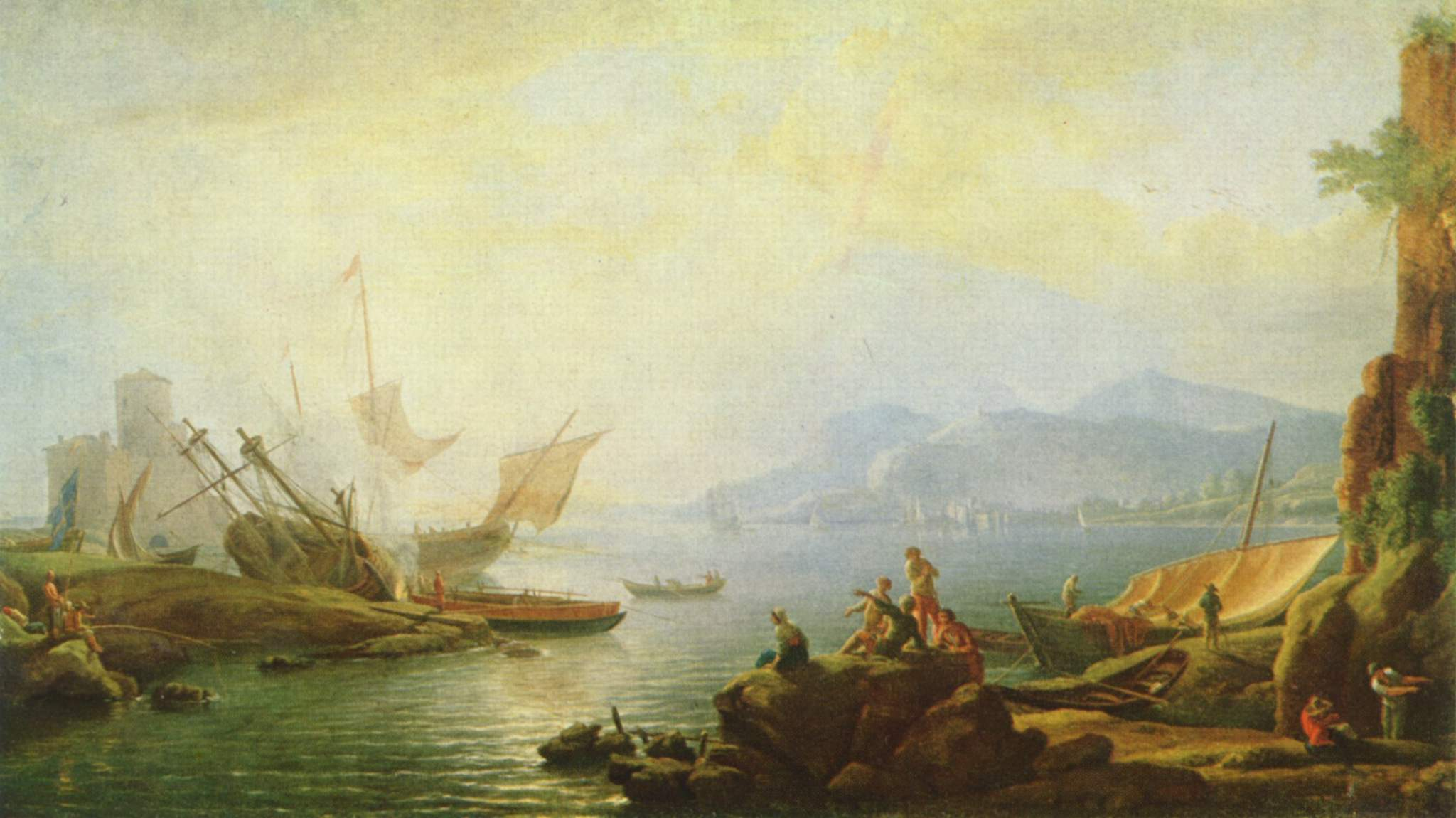
Flußmündung mit Hafen, Museum of Fine Arts, Budapest

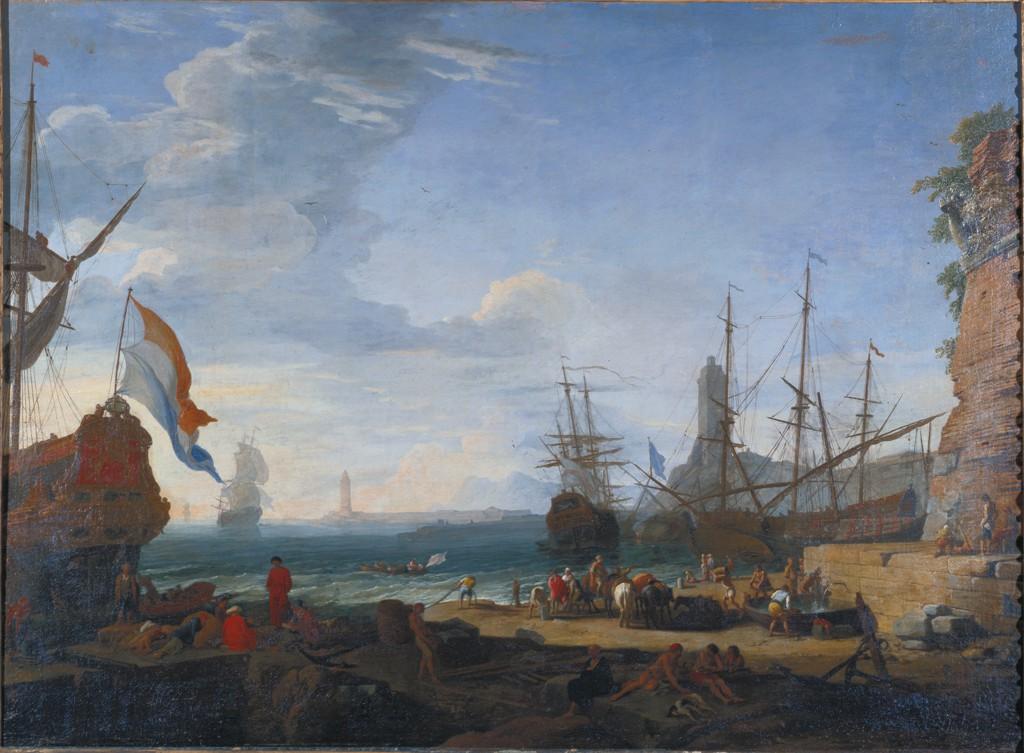
Seaport Scene, The Fogg Museum, Cambridge, Massachusetts

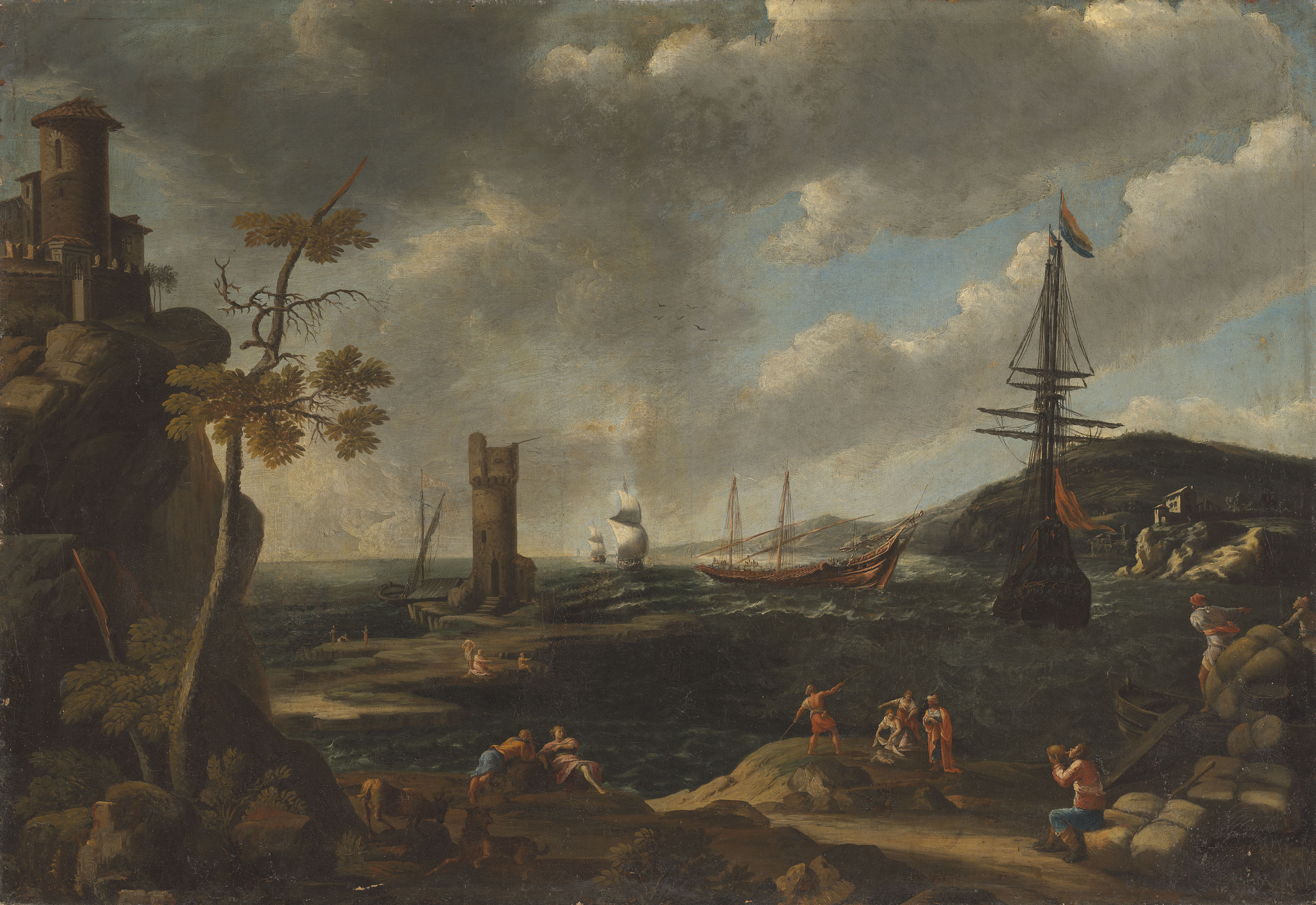
A Coastal Landscape with Fishermen, Private collection, Unknown location

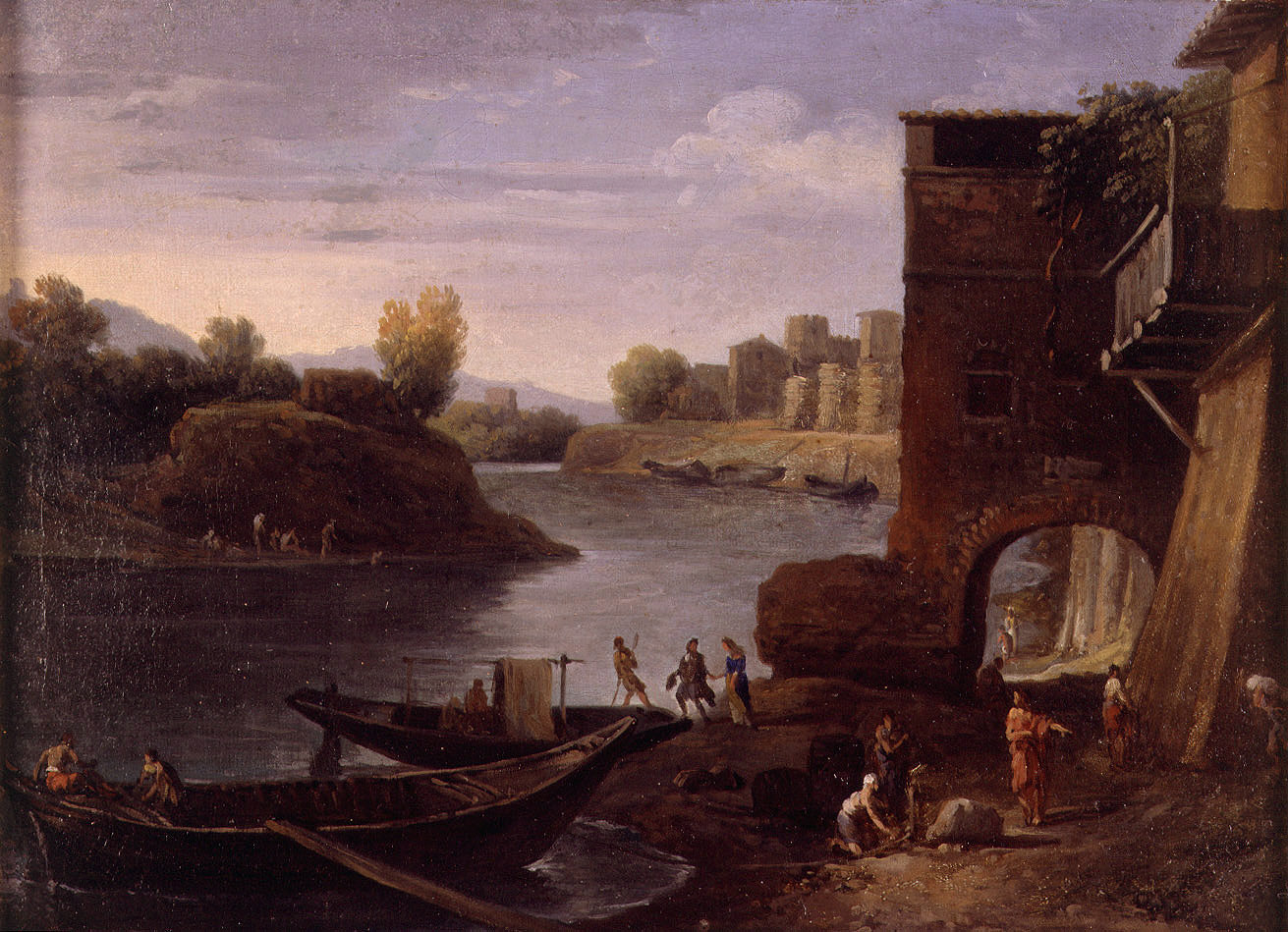
Embarcadero, Circle of Adrien Manglard, Museum of Fine Arts, Valencia

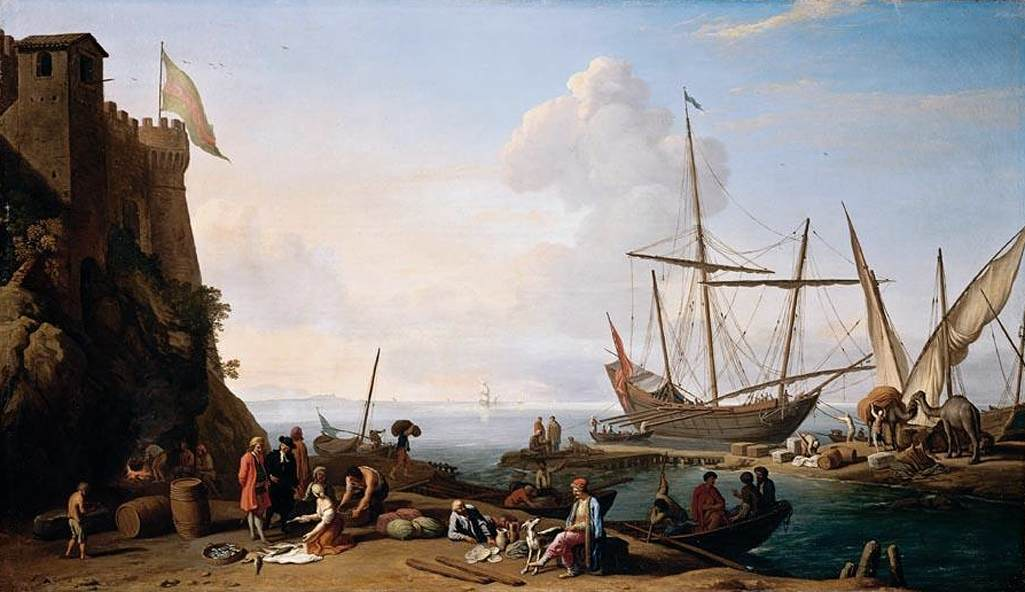
Mediterranean Harbour Scene, Private Collection, Unknown location
