= Adriaen van der Cabel =

Dutch painter

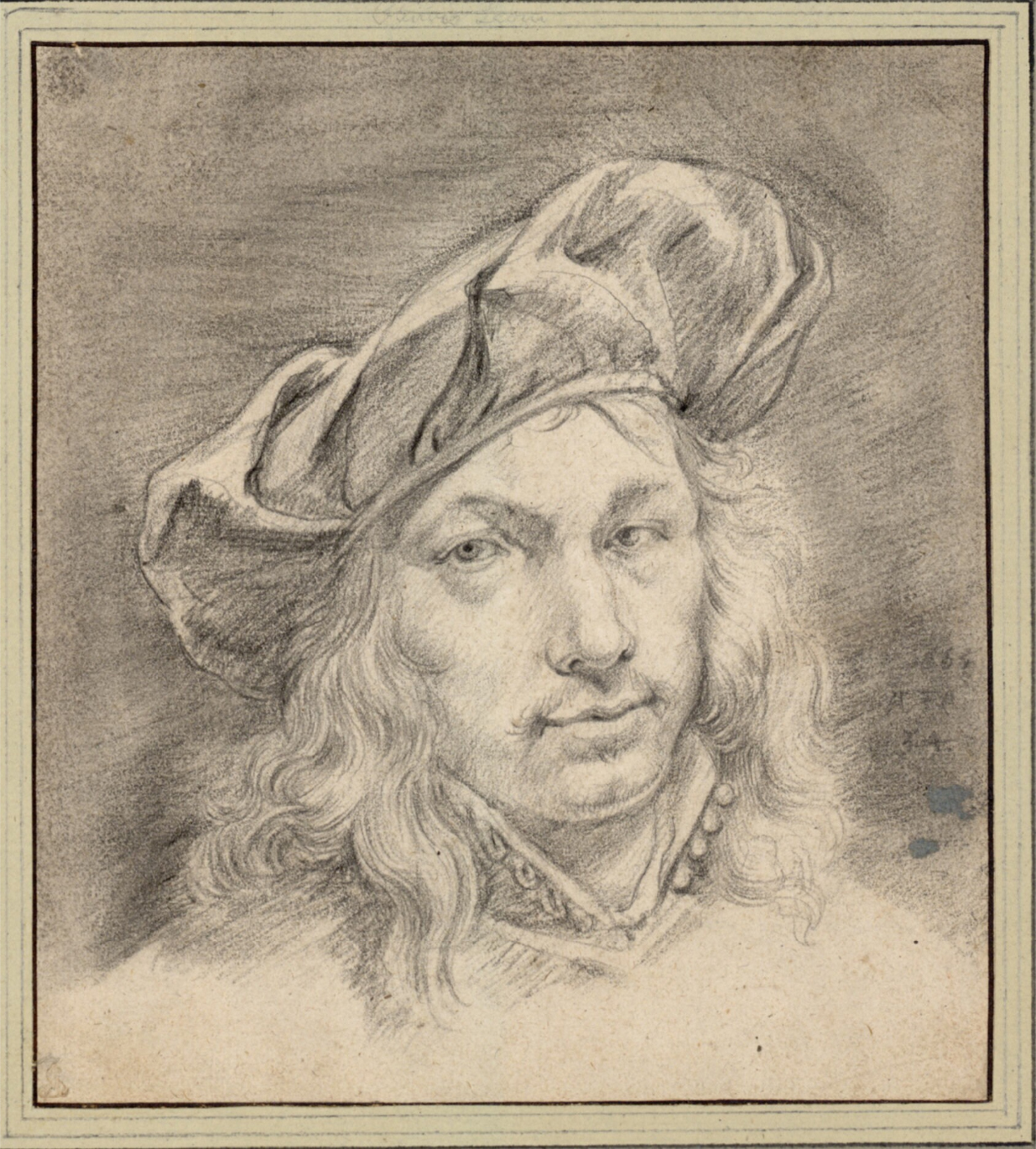
Self-portrait with cap aged 34

Adriaen van der Cabel or Ary van der Touw (1631 – 16 June 1705), was a Dutch Golden Age landscape painter active in France and Italy.

== Biography ==
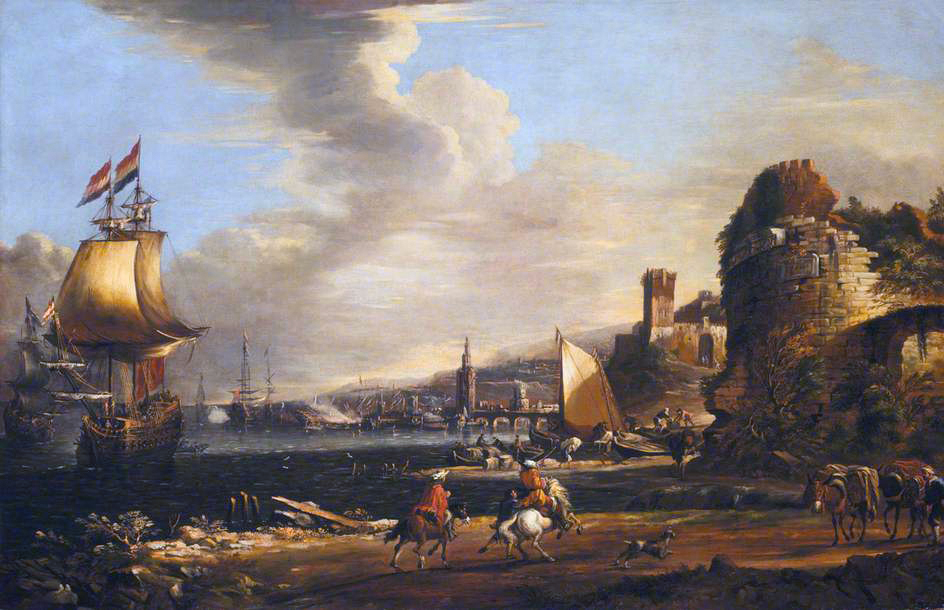
Adriaen van der Cabel, Port of Genua, 1660

He was born and grew up in the small town of Rijswijk, near The Hague. Cabel was also known as Ary. According to Houbraken, he was a student of Jan van Goyen, and his real name was van der Touw (English: "of String"), but that wasn't grand enough according to Van Goyen, so he changed it to mean "of Cable". Houbraken wrote that his brother Engel was also a painter, and that Adriaen was already living in Lyon when Johannes Glauber made his grand tour. Cabel moved to Lyon as a young man and spent the rest of his life there.

According to the RKD, he lived in Lyon from 1655 to 1658, then Rome from 1659 to 1666, and finally Lyon again from 1668 to his death. His bentname was Geestigheid. His work is sometimes confused with that of his brother Engel van der Cabel (1641-after 1695), also known as Ange or Angelo. Engel accompanied his brother on his travels and they both married on the same day. Like his brother, Engel became a member of the Bentvueghels with the nickname Corydon, and he moved with him to Lyons, where in the year 1672, he became a 'Maître-Garde' of the Guild of Saint Luke there.

Van der Cabel's best known student was Lyonnaise landscape painter Adrien Manglard, who was also his godson. Like van der Cabel, Manglard moved to Rome, where he became one of the best known landscape painters of his day. Van der Cabel introduced young Manglard to the Dutch landscape painting tradition, as well as the Romano-Bolognese landscape painting style typical of the seventeenth century, which came to influence Cabel during his stay in Italy.

== Gallery ==
Selected paintings

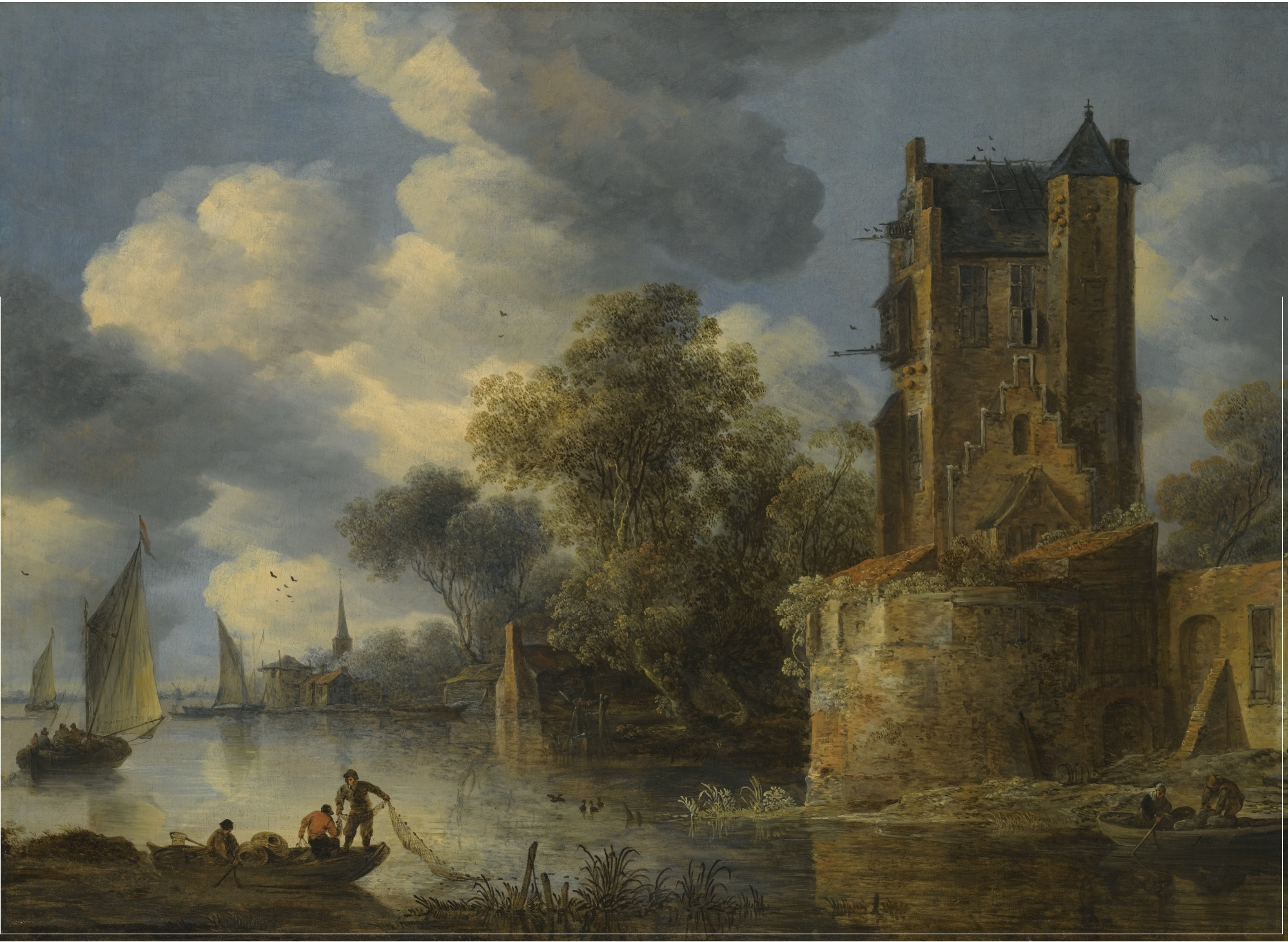
River Landscape with a Bastion, c. 1660s, Private collection, Location unknown

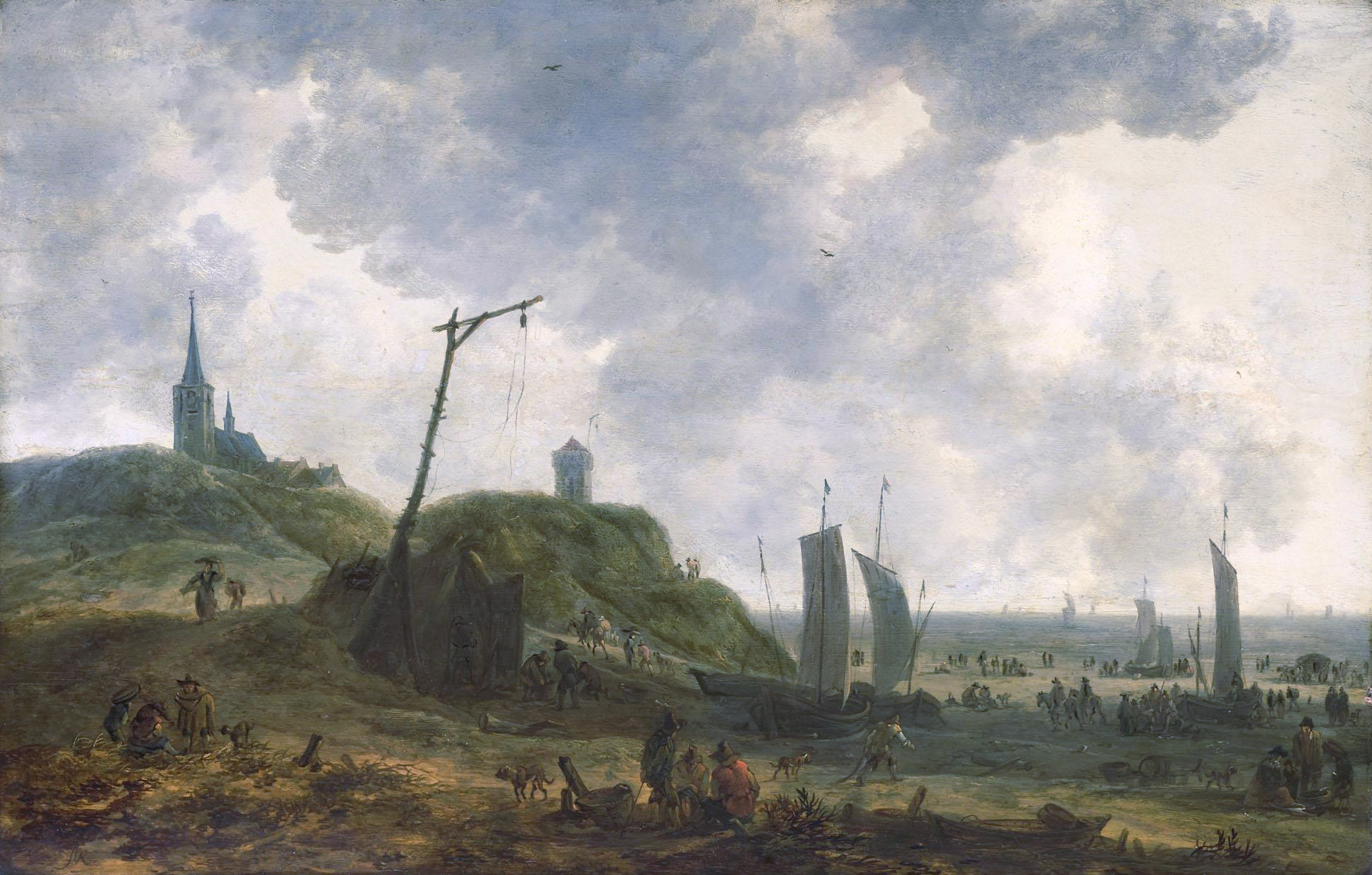
Beach at Katwijk., 1650–1670, Rijksmuseum, Amsterdam

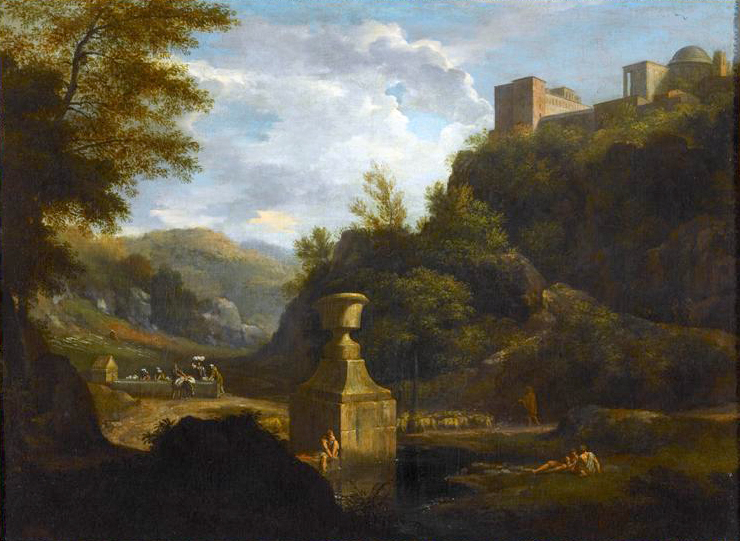
The Riccio Trail near Albano, 1659–1666, Musée d'Arts de Nantes, Nantes

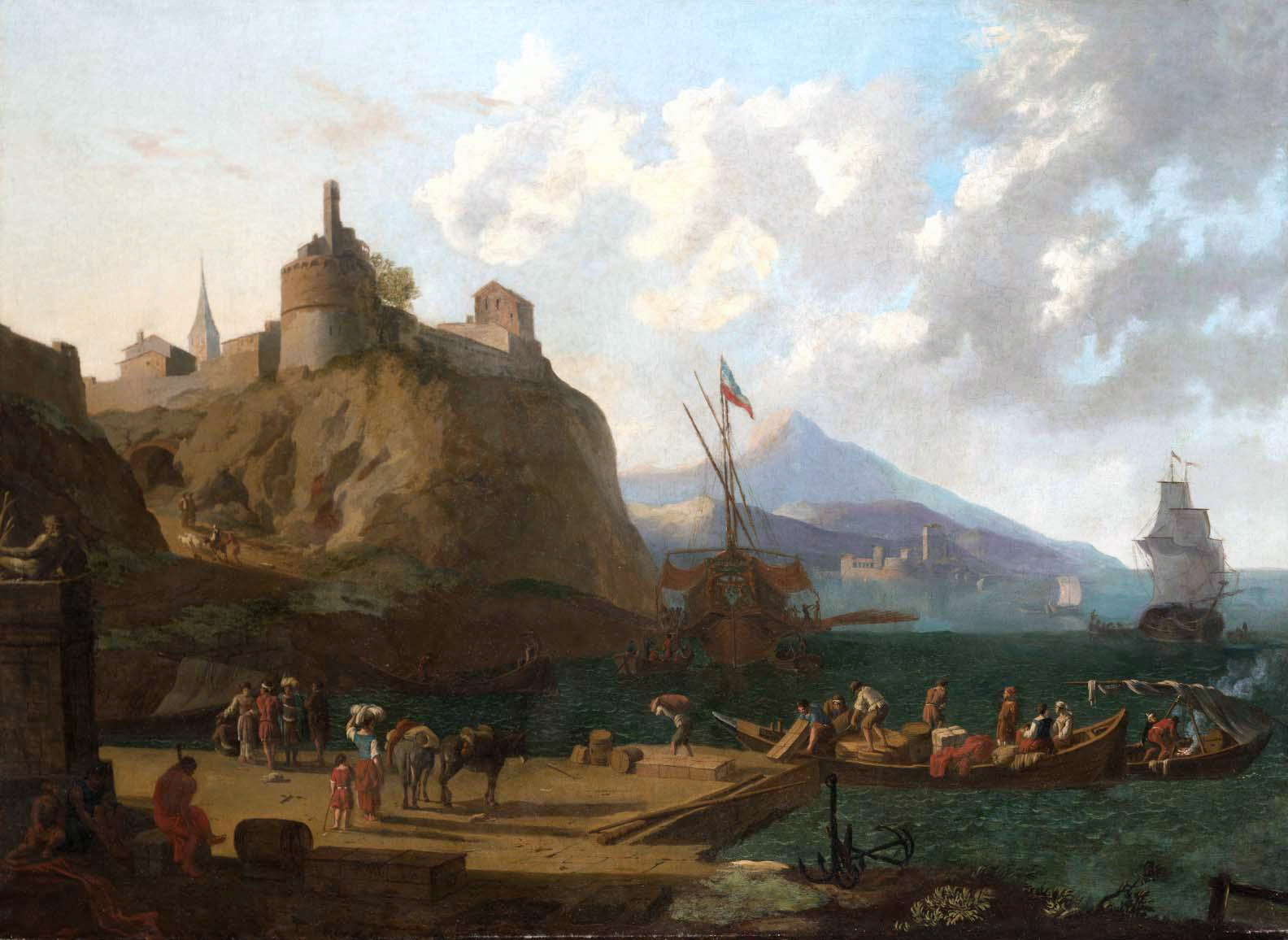
A Mediterranean Harbour Scene with Figures, Late 17th century, Private collector, Unknown location

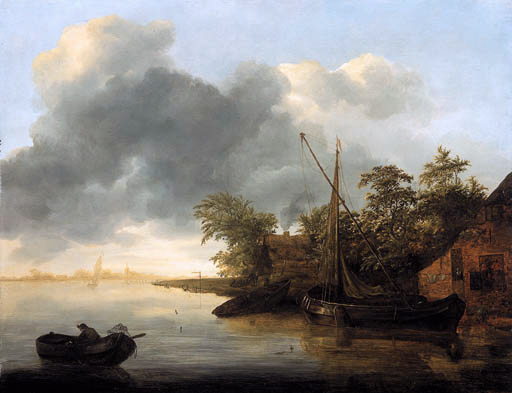
A River Landscape with Sailboats Moored by a Bank, Houses Nearby, a Town Beyond, 1640s, Private collection, Location unknown

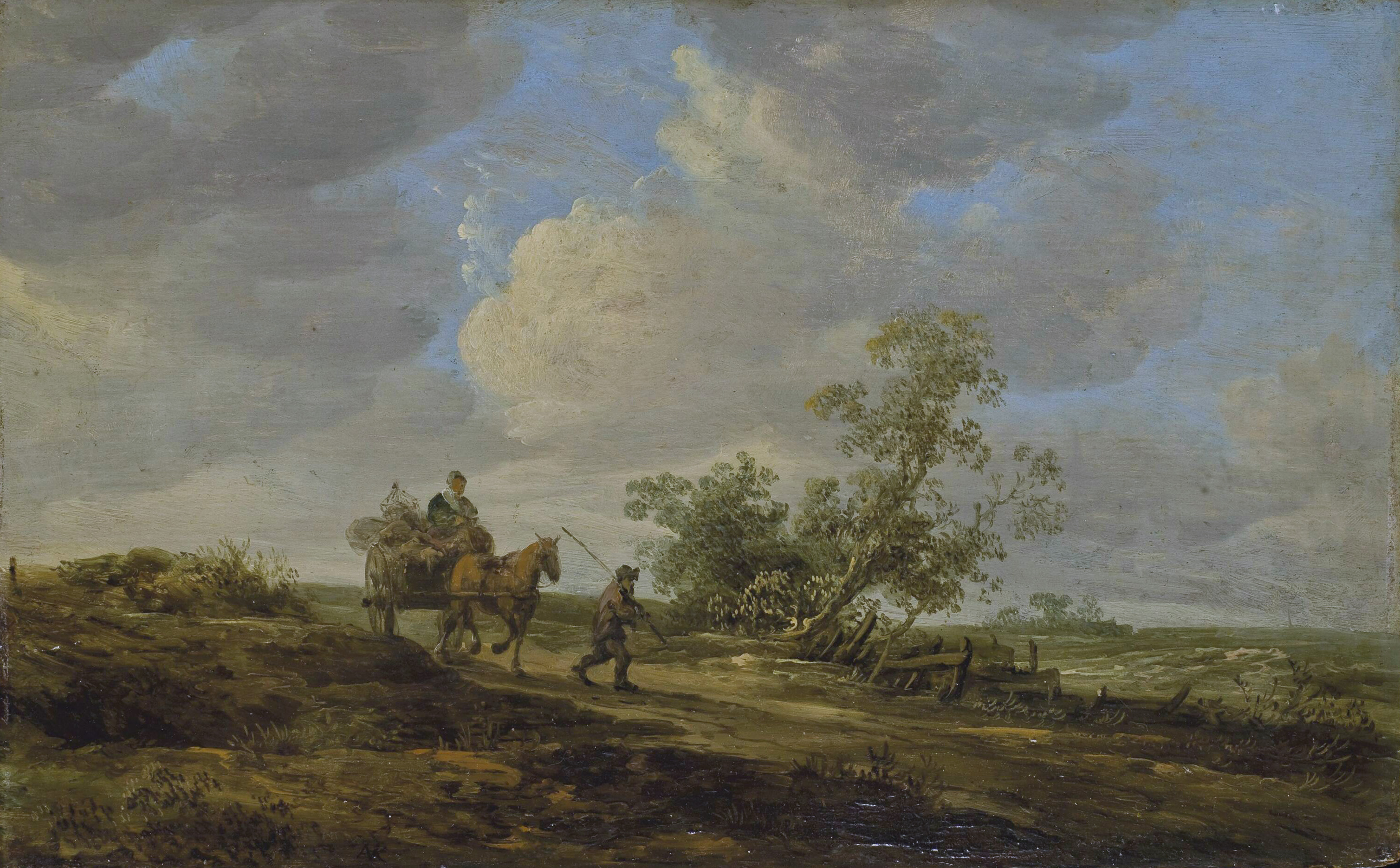
Farmer's Cart on a Road, Unknown location

=== Bibliography ===
- Maddalo, Silvia (1982). Adrien Manglard (1695-1760). Multigrafica; University of Virginia. ISBN 9788875970901.
