= Palazzo Vivarelli Colonna =

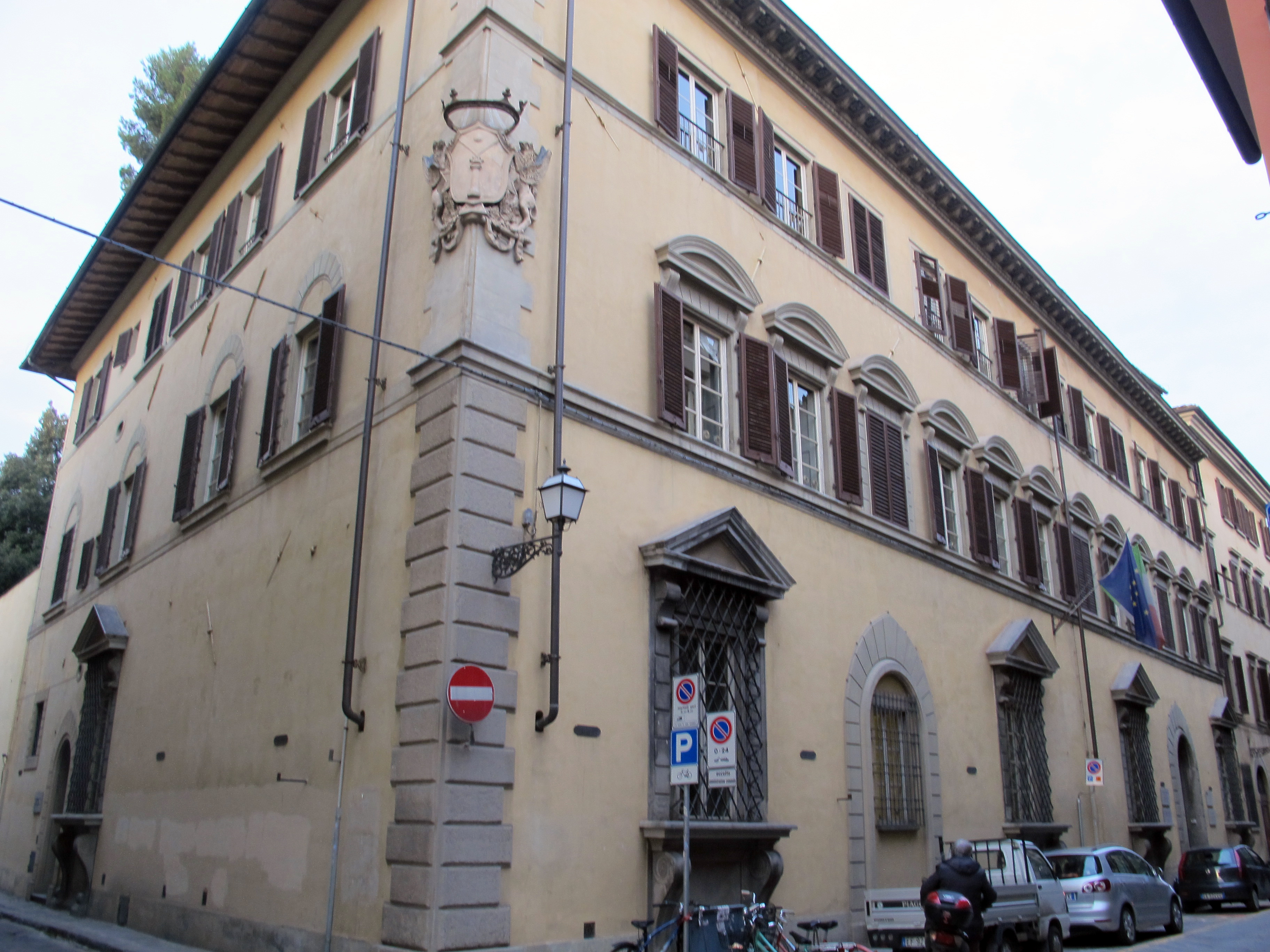
Facade of Palace

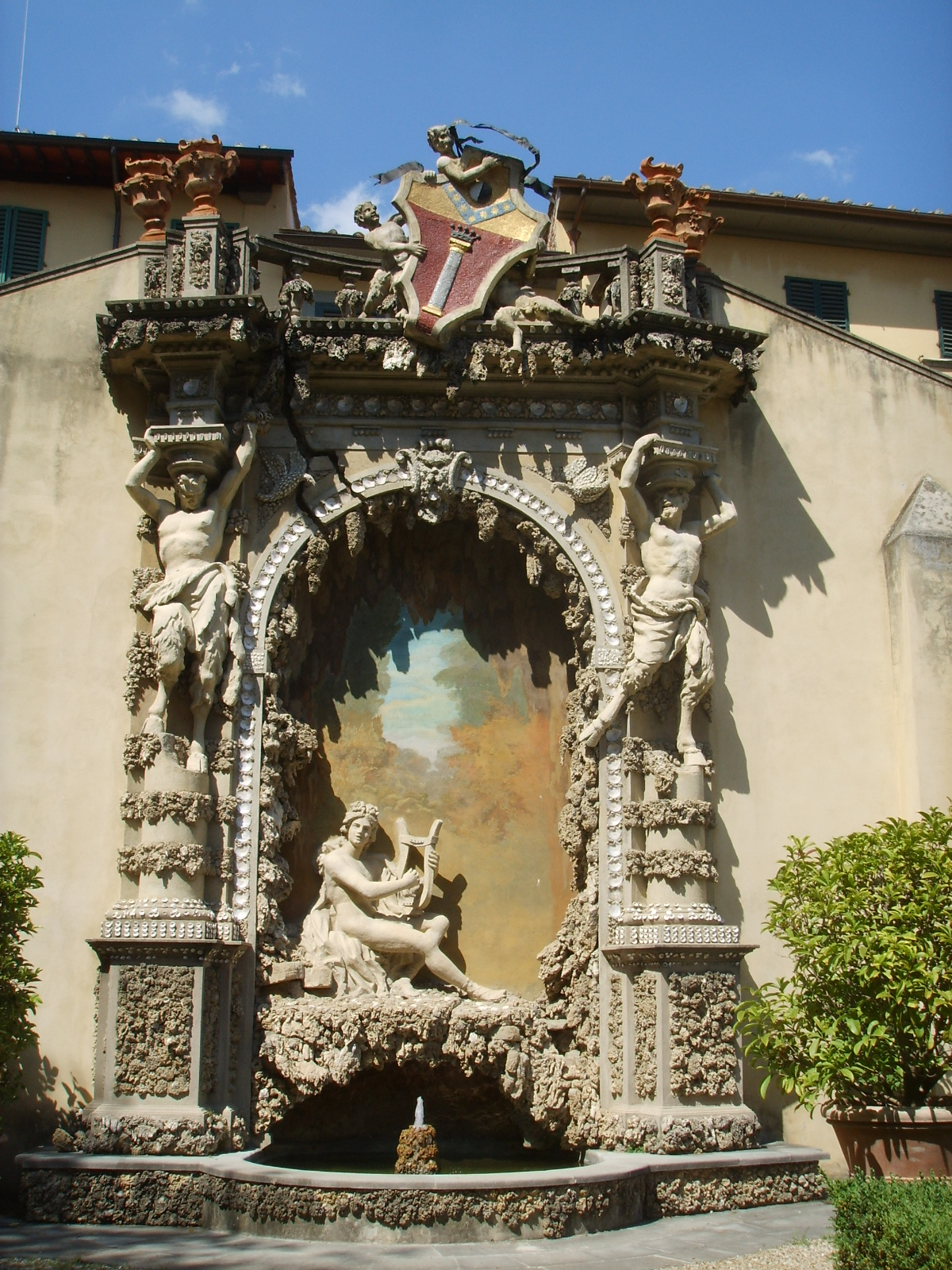
Orpheus fountain

The Palazzo Vivarelli Colonna is a palace located at via Ghibellina #30, corner with angolo via delle Conce, in central Florence in the region of Tuscany, Italy.

== History ==
The palace has had multiple owners over the centuries. In the 16th century, the Granacci combined a number of structures at the locale into one palace and garden. From the 16th to the 18th century it was owned by the Gaburri including by the art patron Francesco Maria Niccolò Gabburri, before being inherited by the Lotteringhi della Stufa family. In the 19th century, it was owned by the banker Michele Giuntini, who commissioned a cycle of frescoes here. From 1857 to 1979 it was owned by the Vivarelli Colonna.

The palace once had frescoes by Antonio Domenico Gabbiani, Pier Dandini, Alessandro Gherardini, and Giovanni Camillo Sagrestani, commissioned by Gaburri. Now the 19th century frescoes displayed in the first floor were completed by Angiolo Angiolini, Luigi Catani, Gasparo Martellini, Giuseppe Collignon, Francesco Nenci, and Giuseppe Bezzuoli.

The palace has a small formal Italian-style garden adorned with an 18th-century wall fountain and grotto installed by Gabburri depicting Orpheus and his lyre. The garden was restored just before the year 2000. The building is now owned by the City of Florence.
