= Joseph Gabriel Imbert =

French painter (1666–1749)

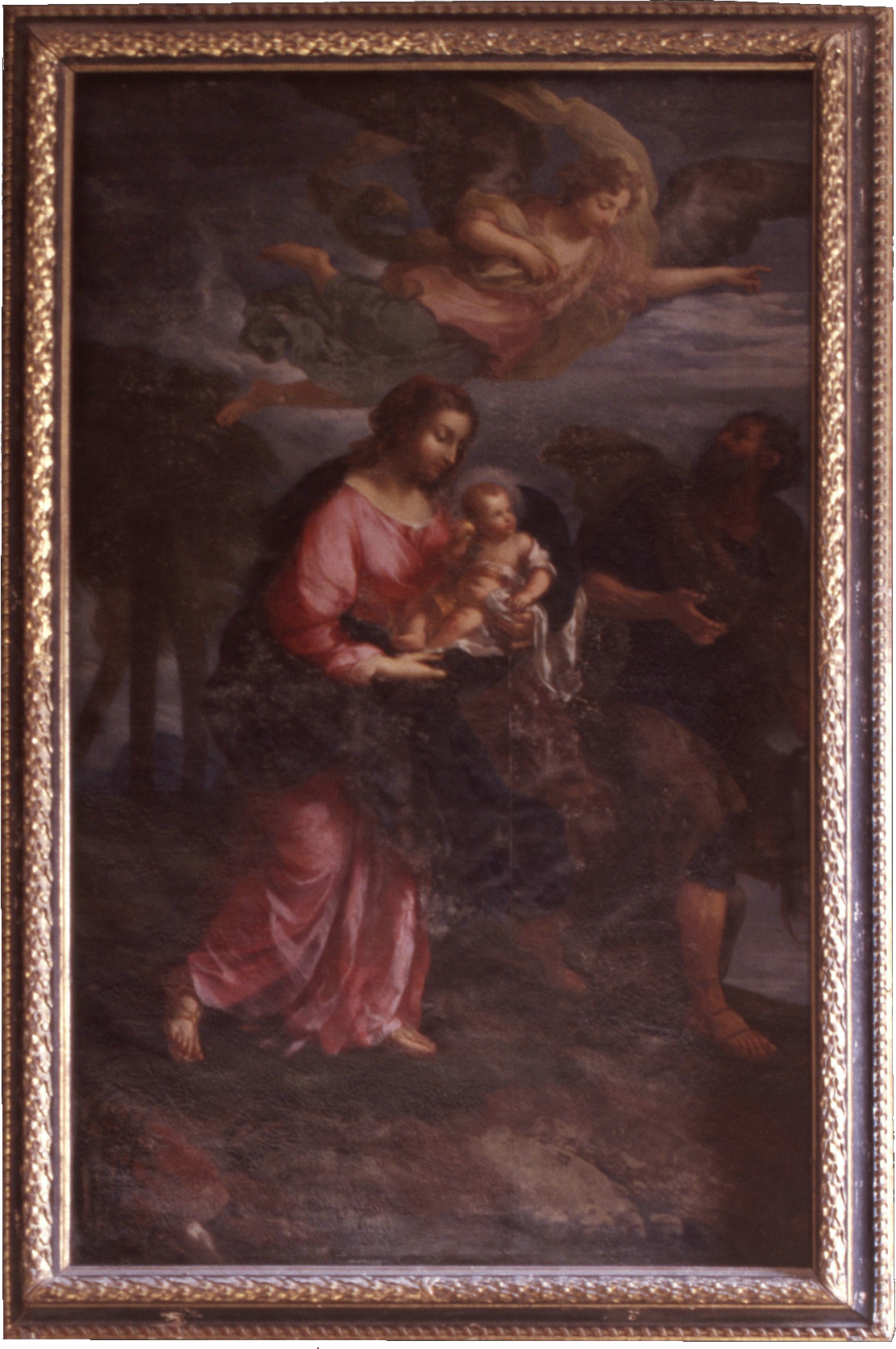
Flight into Egypt, Joseph Gabriel Imbert, Chartreuse Notre-Dame-du-Val-de-Bénédiction, Villeneuve-lès-Avignon

Joseph-Gabriel Imbert, also known as Frère Imbert (1666–1749), was a French painter and Carthusian monk. Among his pupils were Adrien Manglard and Joseph Siffred Duplessis.

== Biography ==
Imbert was born in Occitania in 1666. He was active in the charterhouse of Villeneuve-lès-Avignon, but was originally from Marseille, as in a note on his Fuite en Egypte it is detailed that «[E]t les deux autres représentant la Fuitte en Egipte […] peint[s] par un frère chartreux de ladite maison nommé Imbert de Marseille, ces trois tableaux sont forts haut[s] et remplissent depuis le haut des stales presque jusqu’à la voûte» He was a pupil of French painter and art theorist Charles Le Brun.

He realized several paintings for the Carthusian Monastery of Notre-Dame-du-Val-de-Bénédiction in Villeneuve-lès-Avignon, near Gard, Occitania, including a large painting depicting the flight into Egypt, a copy of Guido Reni's Annunciation, an oil on panel depicting the Marquise of Ganges in the Cartusian habit of Saint Roseline of Villeneuve, and a Compassion de la Vierge (Compassion of the Virgin), meanwhile lost. Regarding the lost painting, it was recorded that it was "the Compassion of the Holy Virgin, painted by a Carthusian brother of the said house named Imbert of Marseille, [it was] very high and fill from the top of the stalls almost to the vault."

Frère Imbert executed also "smaller paintings, works on easel of more intimate expression, and copies of paintings of the preceding century, such as Nicolas Mignard's Annunciation." Imbert "was not only a talented copyist. He was [also] able to elaborate powerful compositions, such as [his] Flight into Egypt […]"

Imbert became a Carthusian monk, and later opened an art school in either Marseille or Avignon. There, he taught Joseph Siffred Duplessis and Adrien Manglard. The latter reportedly learned figure painting with him.

The figure of Frère Imbert is still relatively shrouded in mystery.

== Gallery ==
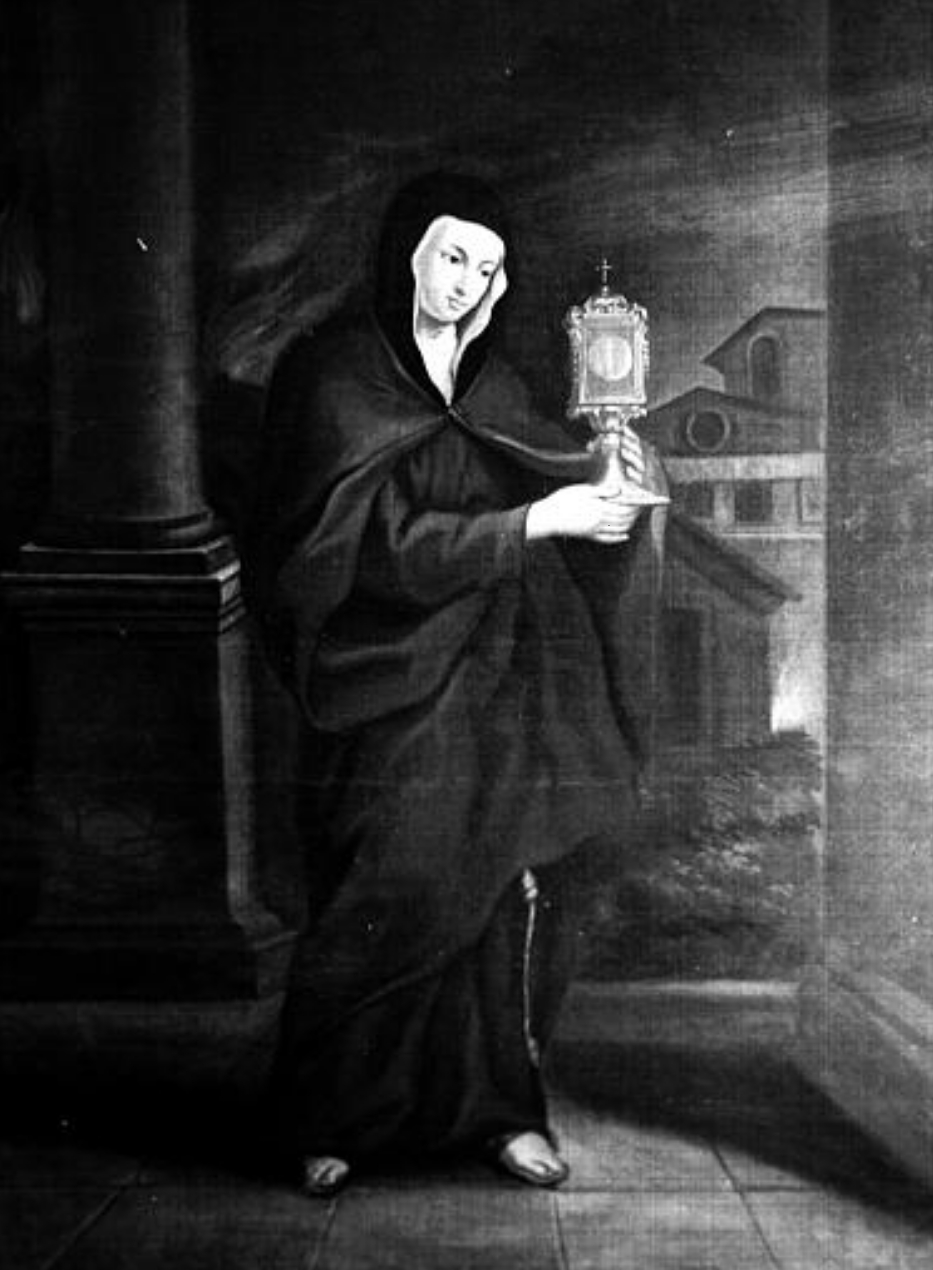
The Marquise de Ganges in the Cartusian habit of Saint Roseline of Villeneuve, Notre-Dame Church, Gard, Occitania

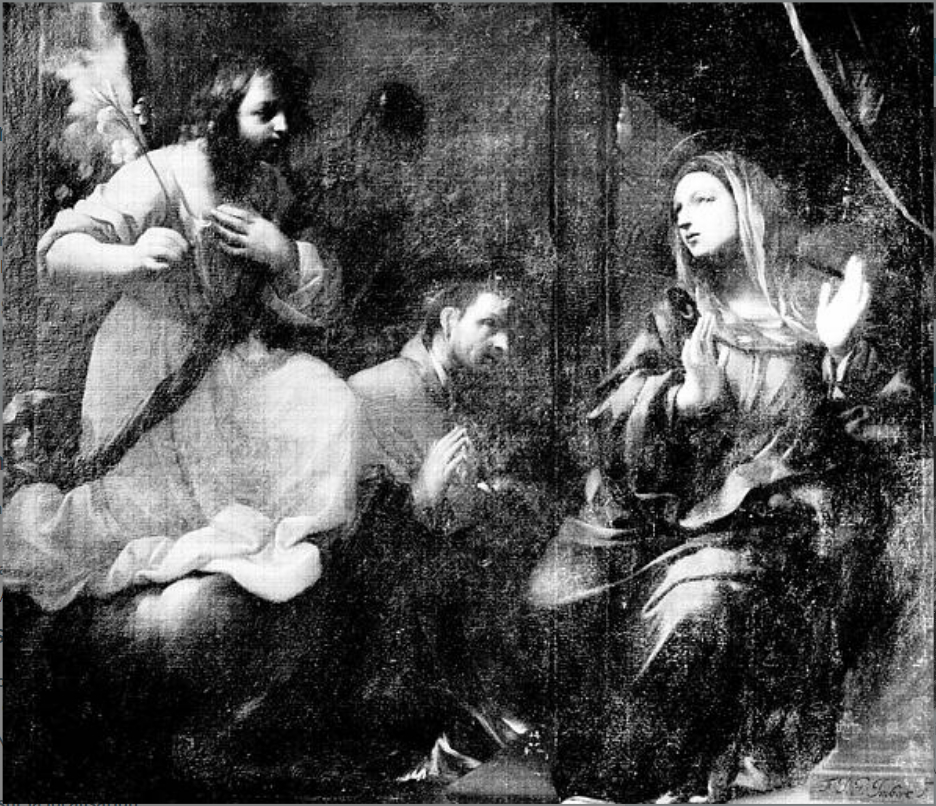
The Annunciation, Notre Dame Church, Gard, Occitania

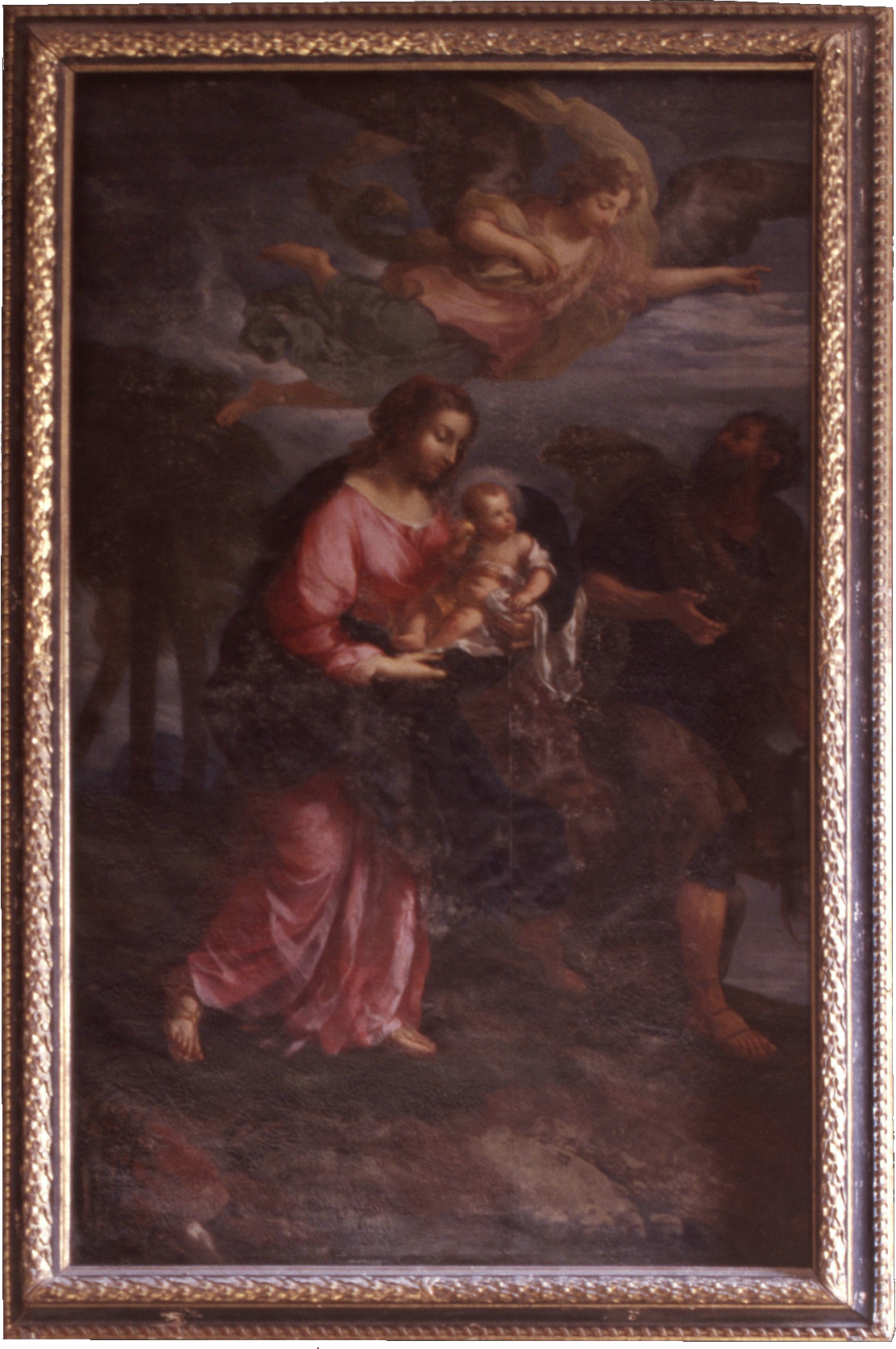
Flight into Egypt, Chartreuse Notre-Dame-du-Val-de-Bénédiction, Villeneuve-lès-Avignon
