= Niccolò Gabburri =

Italian diplomat, painter, art collector, and biographer of artists (1675–1742)

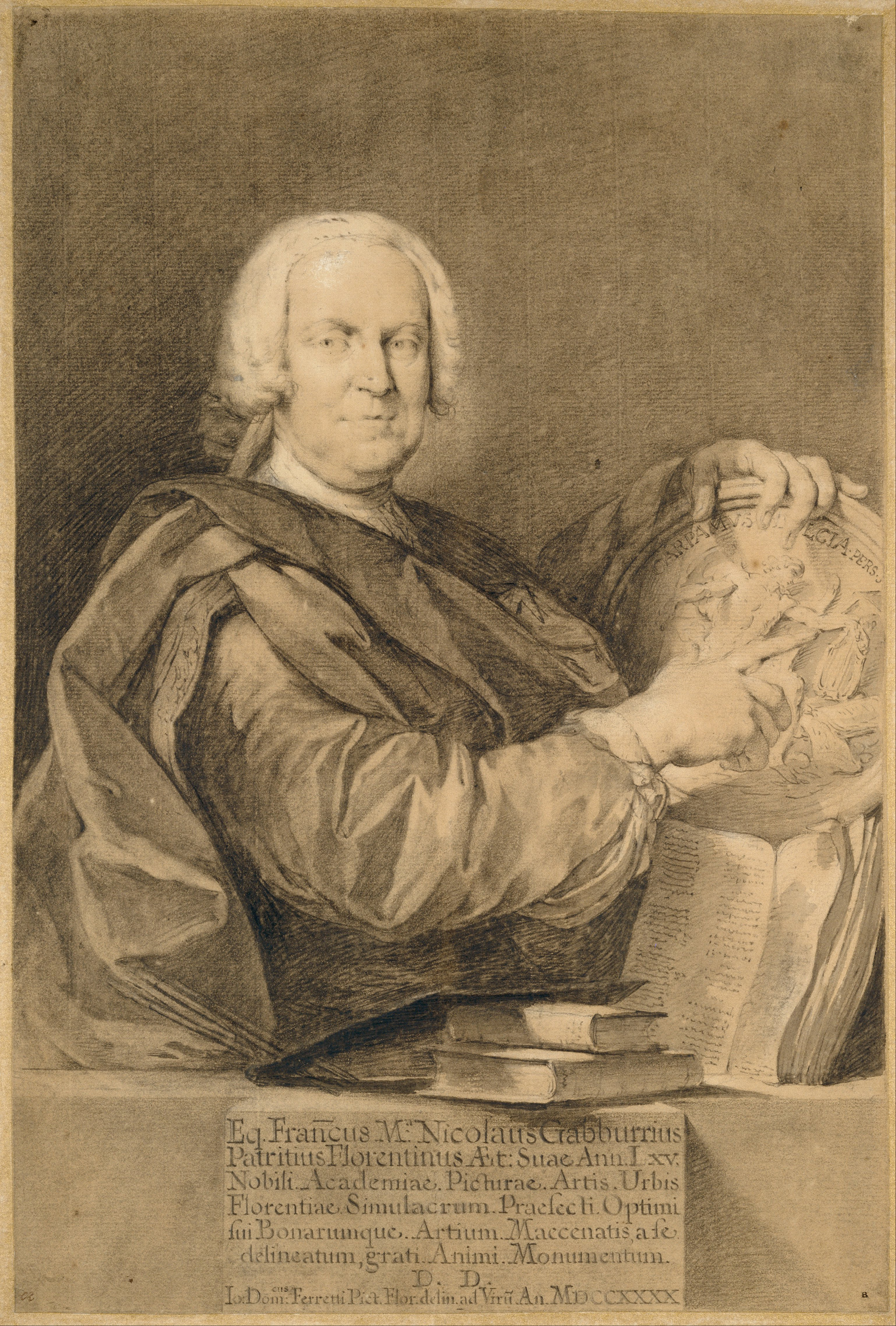
- Portrait of Cavaliere Francesco Maria Niccolò Gabburri by Giovanni Domenico Ferretti
- Born: 17 December 1675; Florence
- Died: 8 May 1742 (aged 66); Florence
- Occupation: Art collector, art historian

Francesco Maria Niccolò Gabburri (17 December 1675 – 1742) was a Florentine diplomat, painter, art collector, and biographer of artists. Gabburri was a prominent art collector, a renowned connoisseur, especially of prints and drawings, and a biographer of Italian artists. He was a friend of Pierre-Jean Mariette and Pierre Crozat.

== Biography ==
Francesco Maria Niccolò Gabburri was born in Florence on 17 December 1675. He was the son of the Florentine poet Odoardo Gabburri and of Virginia del Becuto. After receiving a good education in music, literature and languages, he studied painting under Onorio Marinari. In 1697 Gabburri married Camilla Bonacossi, with whom he had three daughters.

Grand Duke Cosimo III de' Medici entrusted him with several diplomatic missions, but he soon devoted all his time to collecting and the study of art history. Among contemporary artists to whom he gave encouragement was Agostino Cornacchini, who decorated his Palazzo Giuntini, Florence. Pierre-Jean Mariette’s visit to Florence in 1719 stimulated Gabburri to begin an ambitious encyclopedic dictionary of artists’ lives, from the primitives to his contemporaries. The entries in the Vite, modelled on those of Pellegrino Antonio Orlandi’s Abecedario pittorico (Bologna, 1704), have remained in manuscript form (Florence, National Central Library). Gabburri belonged to a circle of distinguished European connoisseurs, which included the Comte de Caylus and Pierre Crozat. He corresponded frequently with Mariette and was a friend of Jonathan Richardson, Padre Sebastiano Resta, Antonio Balestra and Antonio Maria Zanetti.

Between 1706 and 1737 he lent 284 works from his collection to exhibitions organized by the Accademia delle Arti del Disegno, which were held regularly at Santissima Annunziata, Florence. In 1725 he made what was perhaps his most spectacular purchase: 600 drawings by Fra Bartolomeo found in the convent of Santa Caterina of Siena and previously owned by Sister Plautilla Nelli, who had inherited them. These he bound into three volumes (two of figure studies, now Rotterdam, Museum Boijmans Van Beuningen; one with landscapes, now dispersed, sold Sotheby’s, London, 20 November 1957).

The catalogue of Gabburri’s entire collection of drawings (1722; MS. Florence, National Central Library) bears witness to his taste in this field: he possessed numerous pastels and no fewer than 400 drawings by Cecco Bravo. In 1743 Horace Walpole, purchased drawings from Gabburri’s collection, acquiring two examples of each artist’s work. Most of the rest of the collection of drawings and prints was sold by Gabburri’s heirs to the English dealer William Kent in 1758 or 1759.

Gaburri was a knight of the Tuscan Order of Saint Stephen and a member of the Accademia della Crusca. He was elected prefect of the Florentine Accademia delle Arti del Disegno in 1730. In Florence, he resided and presided over the decoration of the Palazzo Vivarelli Colonna.

== Bibliography ==
- Barbolani di Montauto, N. (2006). Edifir (ed.). Francesco Maria Niccolò Gabburri "gentiluomo intendente al pari d'ogni altro e dilettante di queste bell'arti". Vol. Il Settecento, Storia delle arti in Toscana. curated by Gregori M. e Ciardi R.P. Firenze. pp. 83–94. ISBN 978-88-7970-281-2.
- Borroni Salvadori, F. (1974). Annali della Scuola Normale Superiore di Pisa, Classe di Lettere e Filosofia (ed.). Francesco Maria Niccolò Gabburri e gli artisti contemporanei. Vol. S. 3a, IV. Pisa. pp. 1503–1564.
- Gabburri, Franceso Maria Niccolò (1719–41). Vite de' pittori (4 vols. unpublished manuscript) (in Italian). Florence: Biblioteca Nazionale Centrale.
