= Equestrian Portrait of Joachim Murat, King of Naples =

Painting by Antoine-Jean Gros

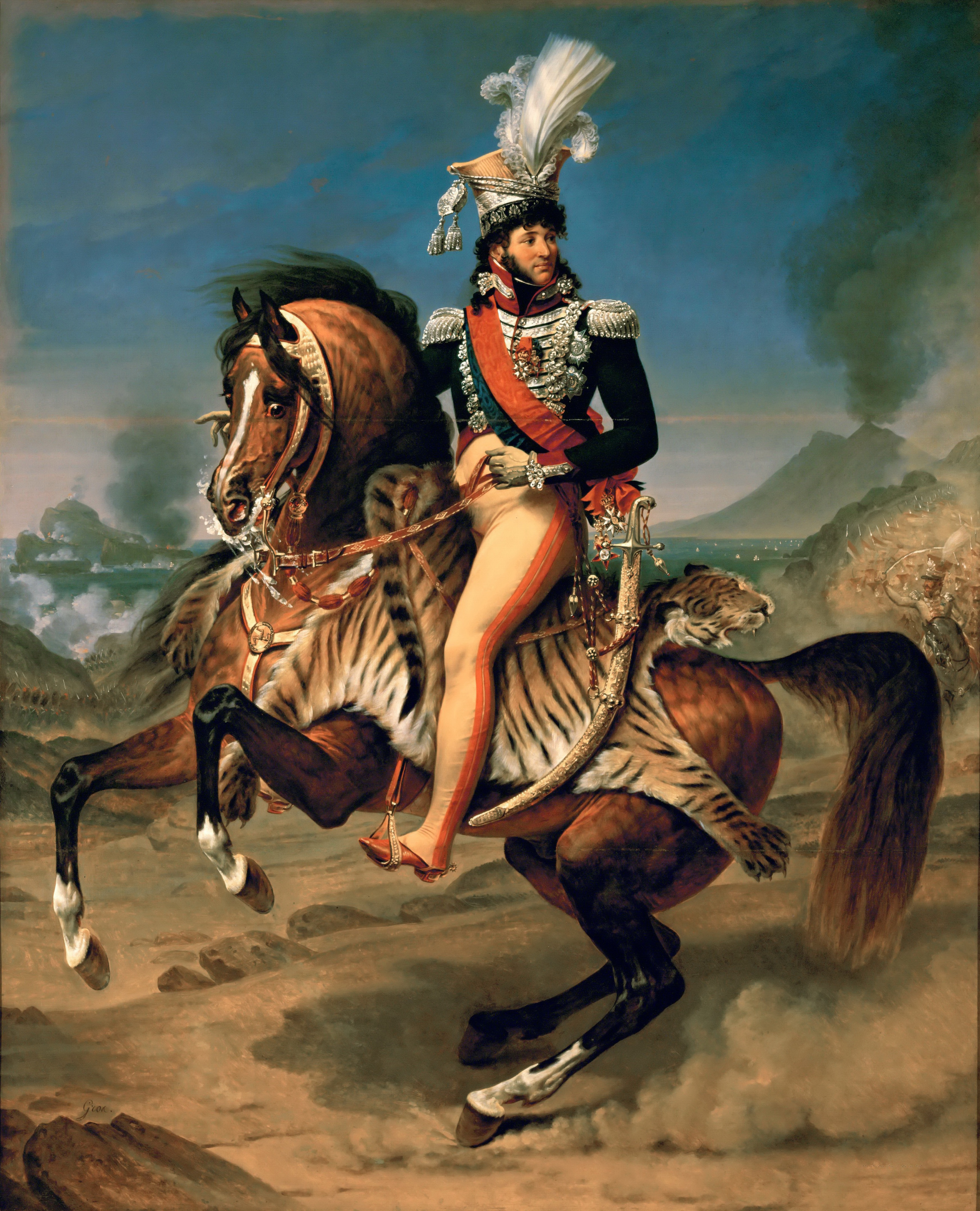
- Artist: Antoine-Jean Gros
- Year: c. 1808-1812
- Medium: Oil on canvas
- Dimensions: 343 cm × 280 cm (135 in × 110 in)
- Location: Louvre, Paris

The Equestrian Portrait of Joachim Murat, King of Naples is an oil on canvas painting by the French neoclassical and pre-romantic painter Antoine-Jean Gros, created c. 1808-1812. It is held at the Louvre, in Paris.

== History ==
Marshal Joachim Murat had several equestrian portraits made of his likeness. Gros knew him well, having met in Milan during the first Italian campaign in 1796. Murat commissioned him the large painting The Battle of Aboukir, which was exhibited at the Salon of French Artists of 1806, before being transferred to the Royal Palace of Naples, where Murat moved in the Summer of 1808, when he was made king of Naples.

The current painting was shown at the Salon in Paris in 1812. Simultaneously with this portrait, Gros was commissioned to paint the Surrender of Capri, but the project remained at the sketch stage after the fall and execution of Murat, in 1815.

== Description ==
Murat is shown in a three-quarters view, riding a harnessed chestnut horse, in a seaside landscape. A tiger skin serves as a saddle cloth. A smoking volcano appears on the right in the distance and a column of smoke on the left.

The King of Naples prances in a colorful uniform where the red cord of the Legion of Honor is superimposed on the blue color of the royal order of Naples.

This portrait reflects the ambiguous position of Murat as king of Naples, since the Bourbons, who had been expelled from Naples, retained control of the Kingdom of Sicily, defended by the British Mediterranean Fleet. Murat was only the head of state of a satellite kingdom of the French Empire, from which he would try to emancipate himself, while maintaining his loyalty to Napoleon.

The tiger skin placed on the purebred Arabian horse raising the dust of a desertic landscape recalls Murat's personal bravery during the Egyptian campaign; the silhouette of the Vesuvius, however, places the painting in the Bay of Naples. The cannonade at the sea on the left in the background certainly represents the attack on Capri, taken back from the British in October 1808. Commissioned from Gros in 1812, the portrait is also a history painting and a vector of political propaganda: it represents Murat as conqueror of his own kingdom, replaying the successful capture of Capri to better mark the failed capture of Sicily in the fall of 1810, due to lack of support from Napoleon.

== Provenance ==
The portrait was acquired by donation by the Louvre Museum in 1973; it previously belonged to Prince Joachim Murat.
