= Bonaparte, First Consul (Gros) =

Painting by Antoine-Jean Gros

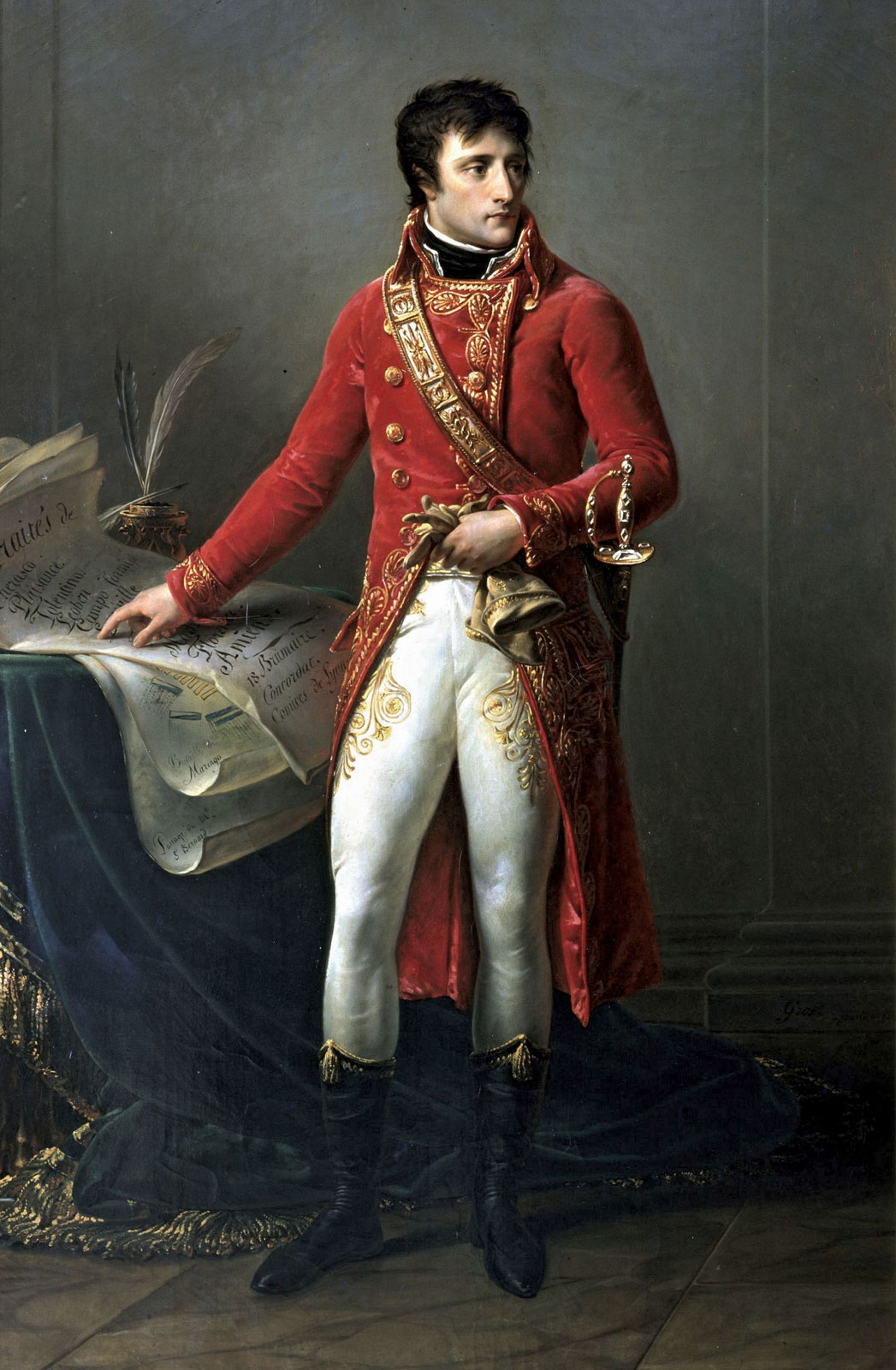
- Artist: Antoine-Jean Gros
- Year: 1802
- Medium: Oil on canvas
- Dimensions: 205 cm × 127 cm (81 in × 50 in)
- Location: Museum of the Legion of Honour; Paris

Bonaparte, First Consul is an oil painting on canvas by French painter Antoine-Jean Gros, from 1802, which is a full-length portrait of Napoleon Bonaparte as First Consul. The painting was commissioned by Napoleon himself who offered it to Jean-Jacques-Régis de Cambacérès, the Second Consul. The original is on display at the Museum of the Legion of Honour, in Paris. Napoleon ordered that replicas of this portrait were made by several painters to be displayed in cities across France and Europe.

== Description ==
The painting is a full-length portrait of Napoleon Bonaparte, wearing the red coloured long coat of the consuls of the French First Republic; his trousers are white with gold embroidery, and he wears Hungarian-style boots of light cavalry. His coat is barred by a red and gilt baldric which supports his sword, the hilt of which protrudes. At his side stands a table covered with a dark blue velvet cloth bordered with gold fringes, on which are placed papers and an inkwell. The consul's body is slightly positioned to the right, while his right hand is resting on the papers, and his left holds his gloves. The decor of the room comes down to a floor made up of large marble tiles, and a plain wall from which a false column is seen.

Similarly for his equestrian portrait of Bonaparte (Château de Malmaison), from 1803, from the same time, Gros used the same fisionomy previously depicted in his painting of Bonaparte at the Pont d'Arcole, also oriented to the left and lit in the same way. The main difference was in his treatment of the hair, depicted shorter.

The painting inspired a similarly named Bonaparte, First Consul, by Jean-Auguste-Dominique Ingres, from 1804.

== Provenance ==
The work was made in the year X of the Republic (1802), and was commissioned by Napoleon Bonaparte, then the First Consul. He offered it to Cambacéres. It entered afterwards the Gaboriaud collection, and was finally acquired by the Museum of the Legion of Honour, in 1949.
