= Bonaparte, First Consul =

Painting by Jean-Auguste-Dominique Ingres

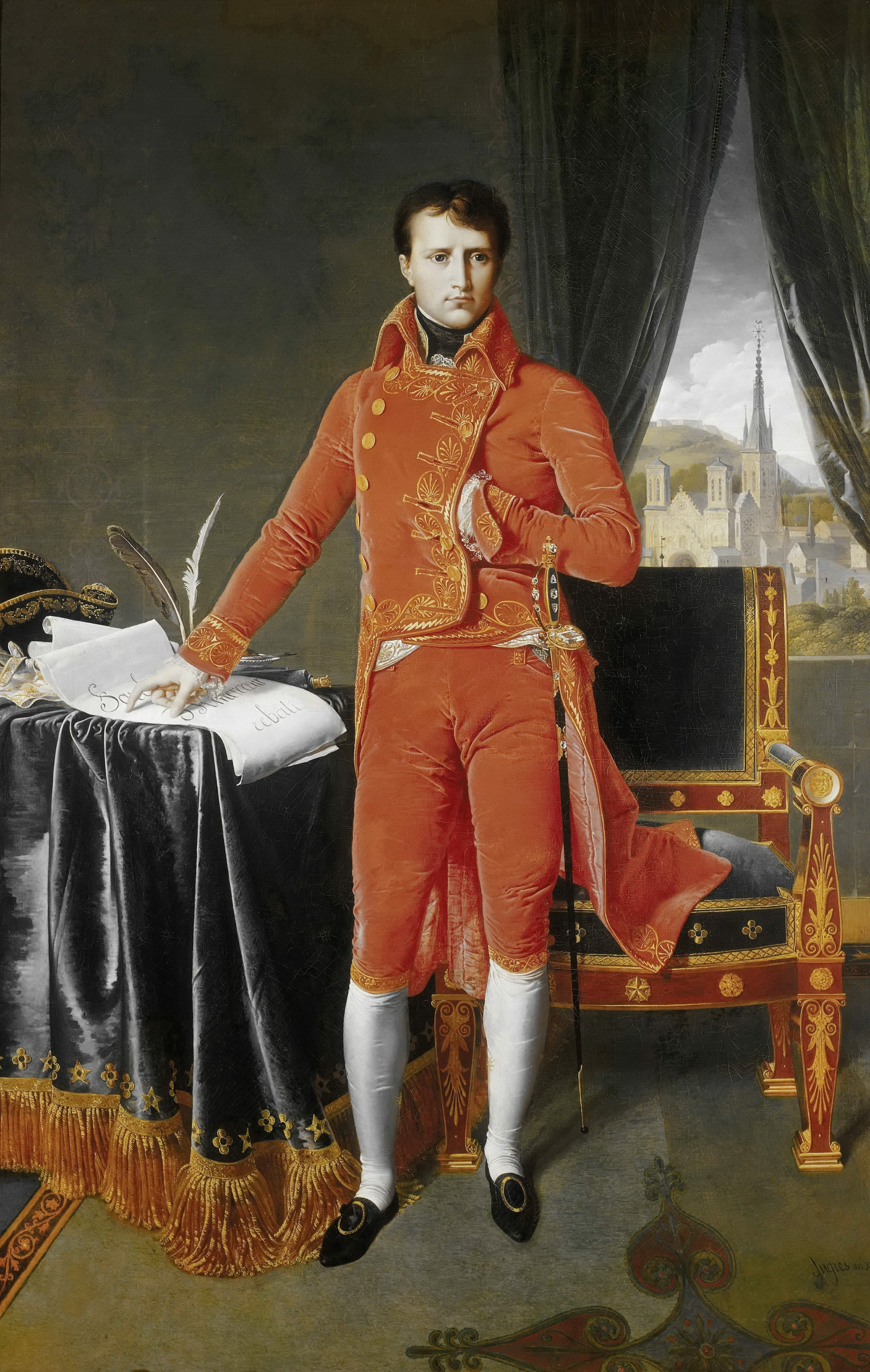
- Artist: Jean-Auguste-Dominique Ingres
- Year: 1804
- Medium: Oil on canvas
- Dimensions: 226 cm × 144 cm (89 in × 57 in)
- Location: Curtius Museum, Liège

Bonaparte, First Consul (Bonaparte, Premier Consul) is an 1804 portrait of Napoleon Bonaparte as First Consul by Jean-Auguste-Dominique Ingres. The painting is now in the collection of the Curtius Museum in Liège. Posing the hand inside the waistcoat was often used in portraits of rulers to indicate calm and stable leadership.

== Background ==
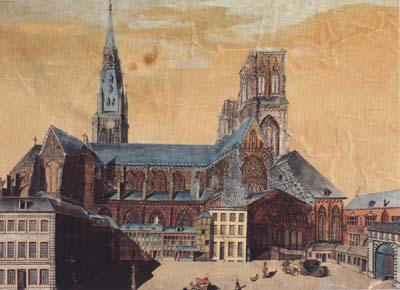
The cathédrale Saint-Lambert in Liège in 1780

On 1 August 1803 Bonaparte stopped in Liège for two days on his triumphal march across the nine annexed départements. On the terrace of a hôtel particulier on the Mont-Saint-Martin, Bonaparte contemplated the city, criticising the église Saint-Jean-en-l’Isle, ordering a bell tower (which it still lacked) for the new cathédrale Saint-Paul and approved the siting of the fort de la Chartreuse. A large crowd (the city's population having tripled during the two days of the visit) gathered to acclaim Bonaparte and some even knelt in his path.

The city's head of state met Bonaparte in the Amercœur quarter, which had been devastated by Austrian bombardment on leaving the city in 1794 after the battle of Sprimont. Deeply impressed by the inhabitants' misery, Bonaparte decreed 300,000 francs to the prefect of Ourthe, baron Micoud d'Umons, for the suburb's reconstruction. The same evening, Bonaparte told the Second Consul "I am extremely content at the spirit of the inhabitants of Liège". To show his satisfaction, Bonaparte announced his intention to offer the city of Liège a portrait of him by Ingres, which would be sent to them a year later. Ingres—who had made his debut at the Salon the previous year—thus became one of five artists (the others were Jean-Baptiste Greuze, Robert Lefèvre, Charles Meynier, and Marie-Guillemine Benoist) who were commissioned to paint full-length portraits of Napoleon to be distributed to the prefectural towns of Liège, Antwerp, Dunkerque, Brussels, and Ghent, all of which were newly ceded to France in the 1801 Treaty of Lunéville.

== Interpretation ==
Ingres was 23 when he received the commission for the painting from the city of Liège. He was unable to get Bonaparte to sit for it and had to base the pose on a portrait of him from 1802 by Antoine-Jean Gros. Ingres' painting shows its subject aged 34 with his right hand about to sign an act titled "Faubourg d’Amercœur rebâti" (Amercœur suburb rebuilt). This decree refers to one signed by Napoleon in 1803 to the prefecture of the Ourthe département to restore this suburb and is an attempt to demonstrate to the newly annexed city the benefits of being part of France and to symbolically take possession of the city.

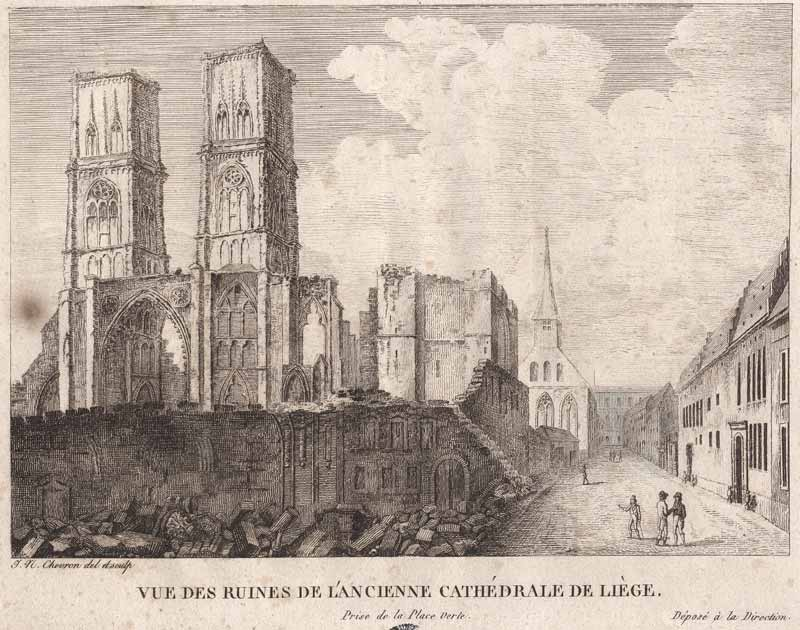
The cathédrale Saint-Lambert in Liège being sacked by the city's revolutionaries

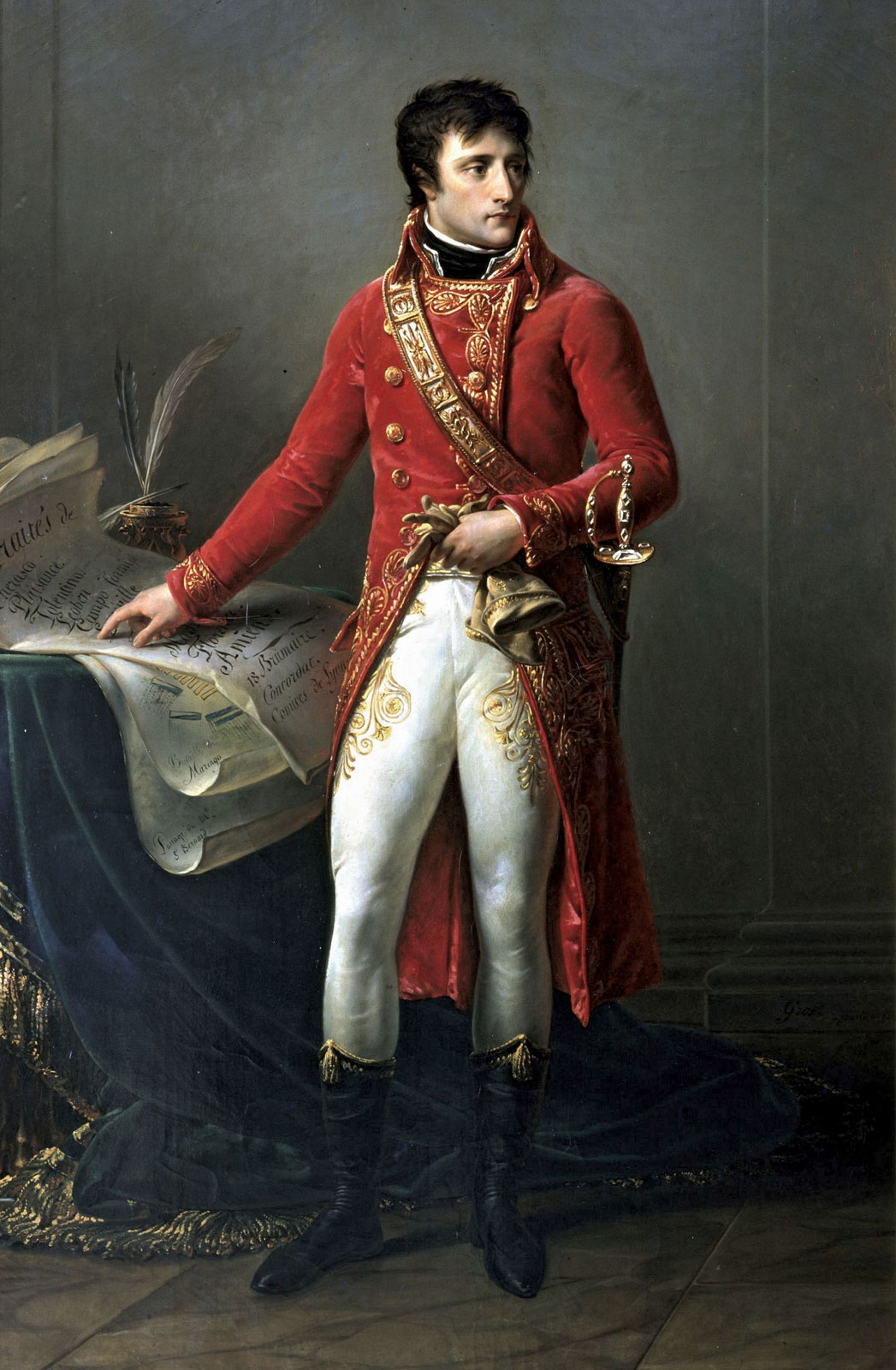
Gros' 1802 painting that inspired Ingres

Bonaparte is shown not as a long-haired revolutionary or in the blue uniform he wears in Gros' Bonaparte au pont d'Arcole, but in the red uniform of a consul of the republic, with short hair. Instead of resting his hand on his sword in a martial pose, he assumes a civilian one, placing it inside his jacket. The curtain is open in the background showing St. Lambert's Cathedral, Liège as complete, when in fact it was being demolished at this time during the Liège Revolution. The excesses of the French Revolution and of the counter-revolutionaries were put into perspective by the painting, in a context of détente and reconciliation between the French Republic and the Catholic Church. Official relations between France and the papacy had been poor since civil constitution of the clergy in 1790, but the painting's reconstruction of the then-ruined cathedral symbolised the resumption of good relations between them and the "protection" the First French Republic granted to the Catholic Church in the concordat of 1801.

== See also ==
- List of paintings by Jean-Auguste-Dominique Ingres
