= The Battle of Aboukir =

1806 painting by Antoine-Jean Gros

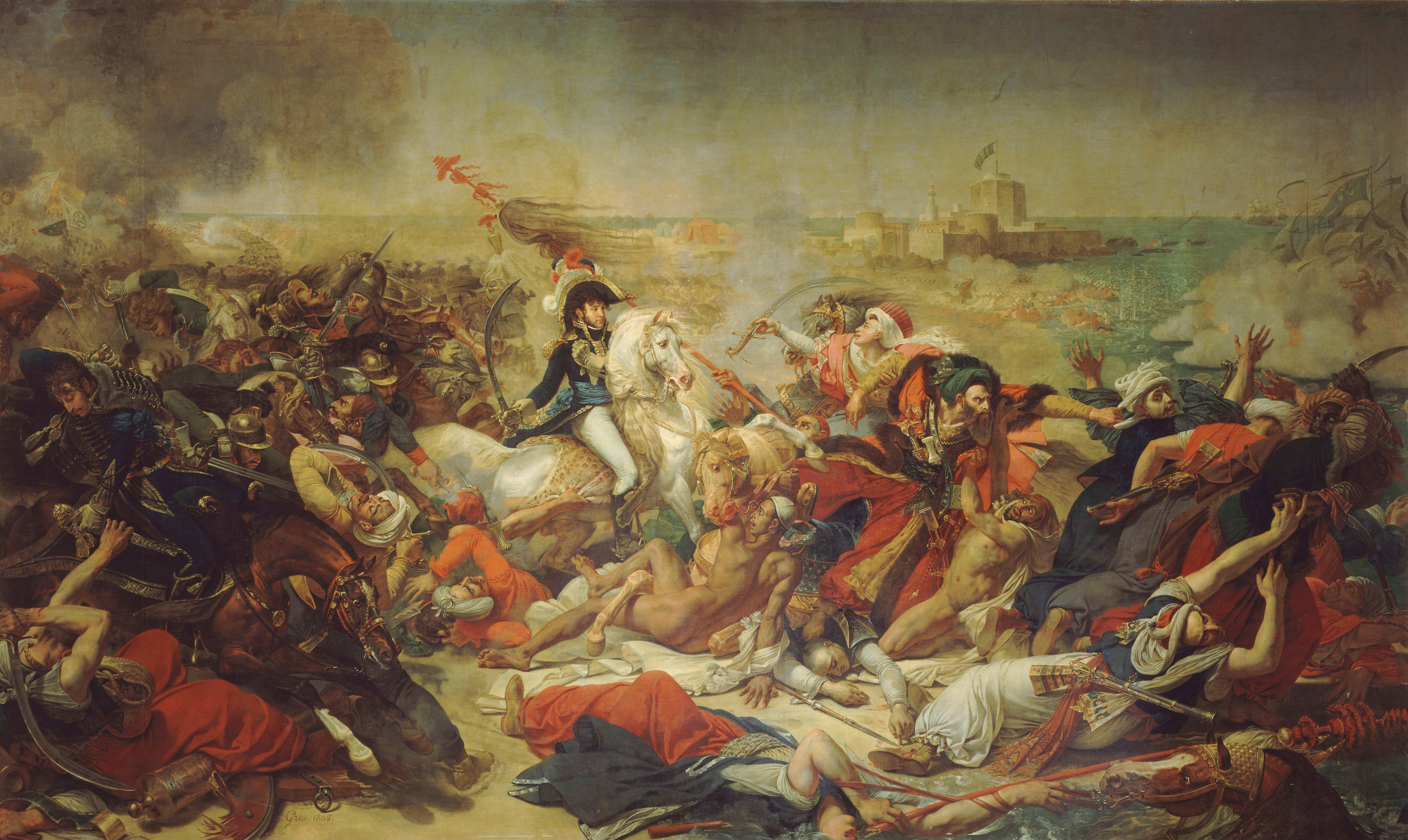
- Artist: Antoine-Jean Gros
- Year: 1806
- Medium: Oil on canvas
- Dimensions: 578 cm × 968 cm (228 in × 381 in)
- Location: Palace of Versailles, Versailles

The Battle of Aboukir (French: La Bataille d'Aboukir) is an oil-on-canvas painting by Antoine-Jean Gros. Commissioned by Joachim Murat in 1805, it was completed in 1806. The painting is piece of Napoleonic propaganda known for its attention to historical detail and emotional intensity. It was in the National Palace of Naples in 1808 and was bought for the Musée du Luxembourg in 1833. Since 1835, it has been in the collection of the Palace of Versailles. An original sketch, Murat Defeating the Turkish Army at Aboukir, was completed before the larger painting, and it is now on display at the Detroit Institute of Arts. The final work served as Gros's submission for the Salon of 1806.

== Historical context ==
Gros's work depicts the Battle of Aboukir, which took place on 25 July 1799 in Egypt. Napoleon's Egyptian campaign, an effort to weaken British trade routes to India, began in May 1798 when he set sail from Toulon with three hundred ships and over fifty thousand men. After landing in Egypt, Napoleon's troops secured victories in Alexandria and Cairo, establishing a significant French presence in the Nile Delta. In early August 1798, French ships in the Bay of Aboukir were destroyed by Horatio Nelson and his fleet of British ships, which significantly diminished the access of French troops to Europe. In mid-July 1799, the British sent a fleet of Ottoman forces to Aboukir carrying around fifteen thousand men. Since French defenses had been destroyed the previous summer, the Ottomans were able to gain quick access. They set up camp just outside the bay, unaware that Napoleon was advancing from Cairo with a slightly smaller army. On 24 July, Napoleon arrived with his forces and engaged the Ottomans the next day. The French were successful in their initial attacks, as many Turkish soldiers were killed trying to behead the corpses of their enemies. The final charge was made by Murat, who is the focal point of the painting, and his cavalry, who chased and killed almost every soldier in sight as they retreated to their ships.

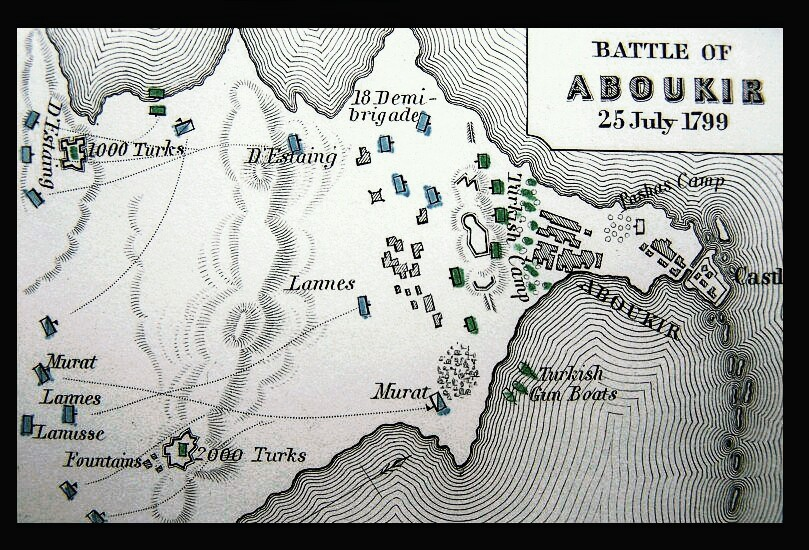
Map highlighting the geography of Aboukir

The battle, a historic victory for the French, marked Napoleon Bonaparte's final military engagement as commander of the French forces in Egypt before his infamous return to France. Despite the triumph at Aboukir, Napoleon saw the Egyptian campaign as a stalemate, with no clear end to the conflicts in the region. Coupled with political instability in France, he secretly left Egypt weeks after the battle, returning home to stage his rise to power.

== Description and analysis ==
Gros and Napoleon had a tight-knit relationship, stemming from an introduction through Joséphine de Beauharnais in 1796. Although Gros did not join Napoleon on his tour in Egypt, he was responsible for capturing many historic events, such as The Battle of Nazareth. Like many of his other works, The Battle of Aboukir exhibits standard characteristics of Romanticism, focusing on intense emotion and subjectivity. Gros uses a darker pallette of colors: red, blue, yellow, and brown. The scene is a cluster of death, combat, and victory. A cloud of dust and smoke hovers over the top of the canvas, with the ocean and fort in the distant background providing context for the battle's location. There are no real instances of still characters; the whole image appears to be in motion, heightening the dramatic effect. Illuminated and commanding the battle on horseback, General Murat wields a sword in his right hand as he charges down upon the retreating Ottoman forces. Beneath him lies a crushed Turk, arms outstretched, as he was about to behead a fallen French soldier. Another beheading is visible in the bottom left corner, as a Turk in red is collapsing with the severed head of a French soldier in a satchel attached to his chest. The left side of the canvas is dominated by French soldiers, depicted in blue, delivering calculated and organized attacks, while the right side shows Ottoman forces, scattered and disorganized, collapsing or retreating toward the bay. Horses, an important feature of the painting, carry dramatic facial expressions and rearing postures, adding to the chaos of the situation.

This work is a classic example of Napoleonic propaganda art, glorifying the heroism and valor of France while brutalizing and dehumanizing the image of the Ottomans. Gros exaggerated the physical nature of the Ottomans, depicting them wearing large turbans and elaborate, exotic uniforms, emphasizing their foreignness and differences from the French. The French, calm and strategic, triumph over the disorganized and brutal Ottomans.

The painting also reflects historical accuracies from the battle, including the Turkish practice of beheading their fallen opponents. This practice reportedly outraged the French infantry, who channeled their aggression into a disciplined and decisive attack that secured their victory. Although the campaign in Egypt was largely unsuccessful, French loss of naval dominance in the bay from the previous summer made this victory an important turning point in restoring French morale and Napoleon's reputation at a critical time in history. Murat's stoic and commanding presence in the center of the painting is noteworthy, as it reiterates Gros's interpretation of French heroism and leadership. While Napoleon is not actually present in the scene, the painting celebrates his leadership and brilliance, reinforcing his growing role in world history at the time. It positions the battle as a turning point in history, paving the way for Napoleon's imminent return to France and coronation as Emperor of the First French Empire.

== Display in the Salle du Sacre ==
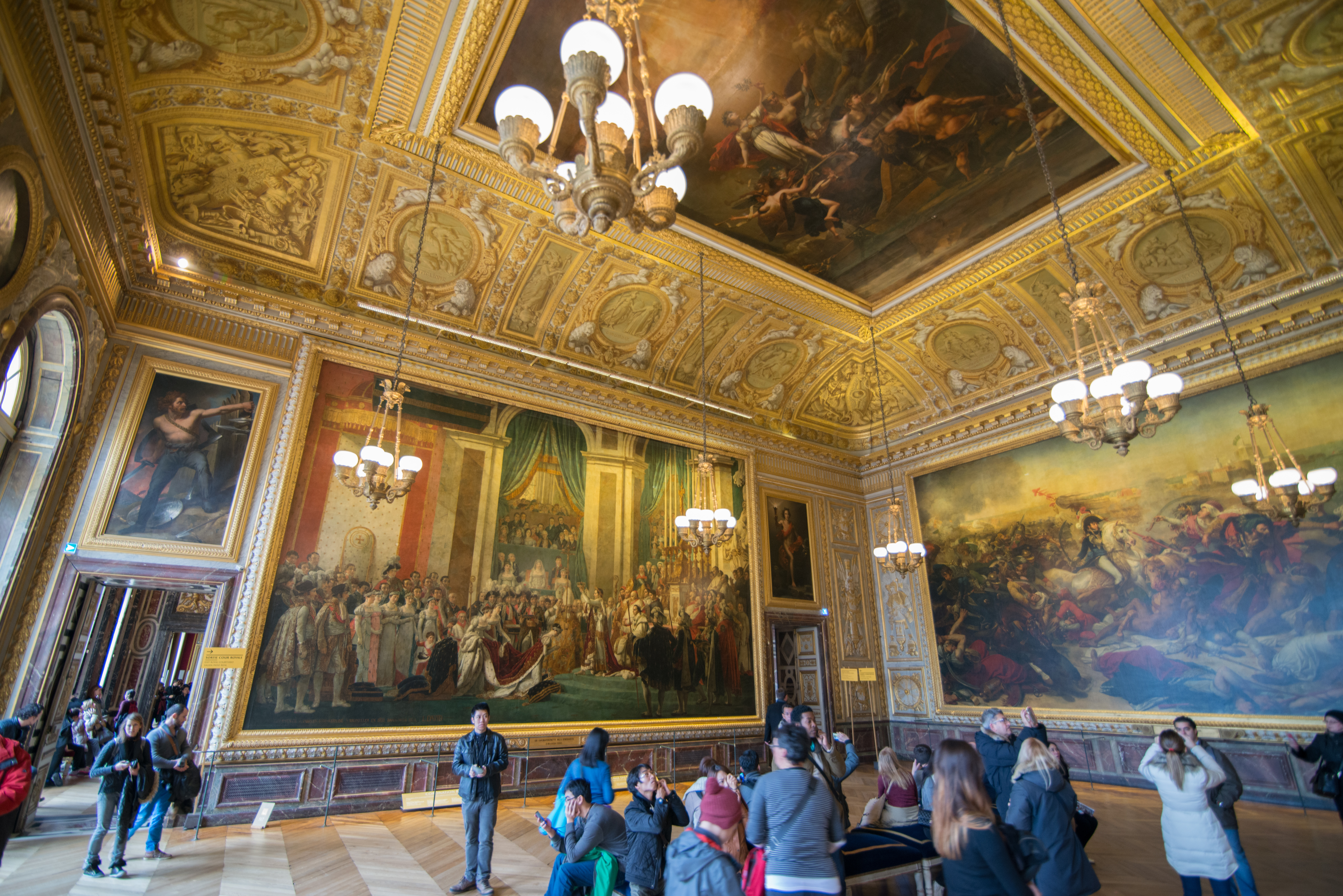
Picture from inside the Salle du Sacre, with The Battle of Aboukir positioned on the right-hand side

The Battle of Aboukir serves as an important component of the Salle du Sacre gallery at Versailles, which was constructed in 1834 per order of Louis Philippe I. The gallery was originally dedicated as a tribute to Napoleon as an emperor. Gros's work aligns with the gallery's broader goal of celebrating Napoleon's military and political legacy. Other works in the room, such as the Consecration of the Emperor Napoleon and Oath of the Army Made to the Emperor by Jacques-Louis David (located on the west and east walls of the gallery), display Napoleon as the focal point of the scene to honor him as emperor. Scholars argue that the reputation of Napoleon's victory at Aboukir was tainted due to his supposed abandonment of the campaign in Egypt for personal reasons. The inclusion of The Battle of Aboukir in the Salle du Sacre was meant to be a reminder that Napoleon won this battle in glory, and also to serve as a transitional piece from his role as commander to his role as Emperor.

== See also ==
- See a list of paintings by Antoine-Jean Gros
