= Portrait of the Maistre Sisters =

Painting by Antoine-Jean Gros

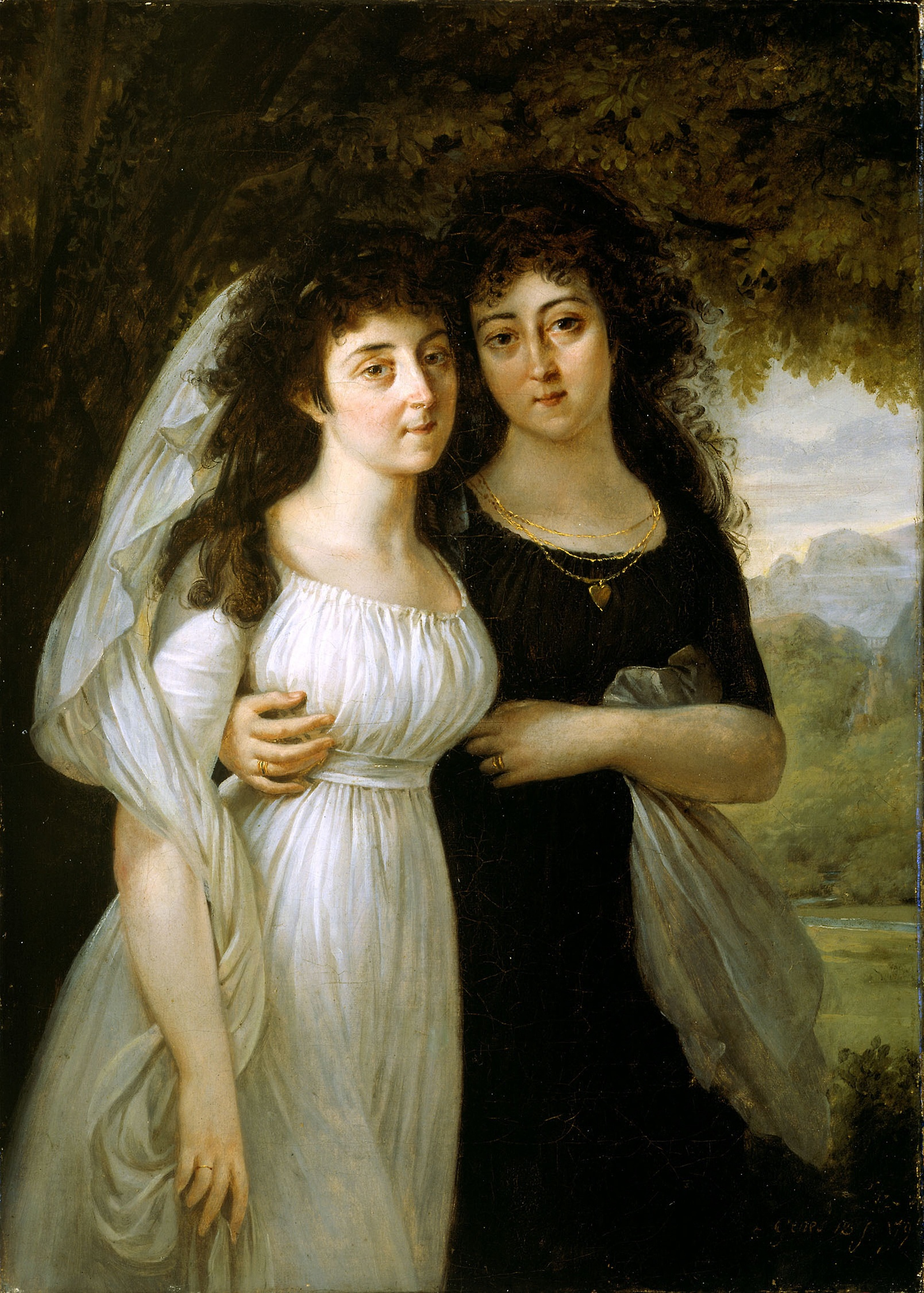
- Artist: Antoine-Jean Gros
- Year: 1796
- Type: Oil on canvas, portrait painting
- Dimensions: 43.2 cm × 31.2 cm (17.0 in × 12.3 in)
- Location: Art Institute of Chicago, Illinois

Portrait of the Maistre Sisters is a 1796 oil-on-canvas portrait painting by the French artist Antoine-Jean Gros. Gros, a former pupil of Jacques-Louis David, became known for his history paintings blending neoclassicism and romanticism. He also produces a number of portraits of including this depiction of the fashionable Maistre sisters. It was painted during the French Directory, the more moderate era that followed the Reign of Terror. Today the painting is in the Art Institute of Chicago in Illinois, having been acquired in 1990.

== Bibliography ==
- Fienberg, Larry J., Warner, Malcolm & Wolff, Warner. French and British Paintings from 1600 to 1800 in the Art Institute of Chicago. Art Institute of Chicago, 2009.
