= Pierrette-Madeleine-Cécile Durand =

French artist (1745–1831)

Pierrette-Madeleine-Cécile Durand, later Gros (1745–1831) was a French painter, the mother of Antoine-Jean Gros.

Born in Paris, Durand was the daughter of merchant Antoine-Sébastien Durand or Durant (1712–1787). She married the painter Jean-Antoine Gros in Paris on April 2, 1770. Besides Antoine-Jean they also had a daughter, Jeanne-Cécile (1774–1848). Durand was active as a miniaturist and pastellist during her career. Several pastels signed "Mlle. Durand" dating to between 1763 and 1777 have been documented, but it seems unlikely that she would have used that signature during the entirety of that period. No other work is known to have survived.
