= Strossmayer Gallery of Old Masters =

Coordinates: 45°48′34″N 15°58′43″E

- Strossmayerova galerija starih majstora
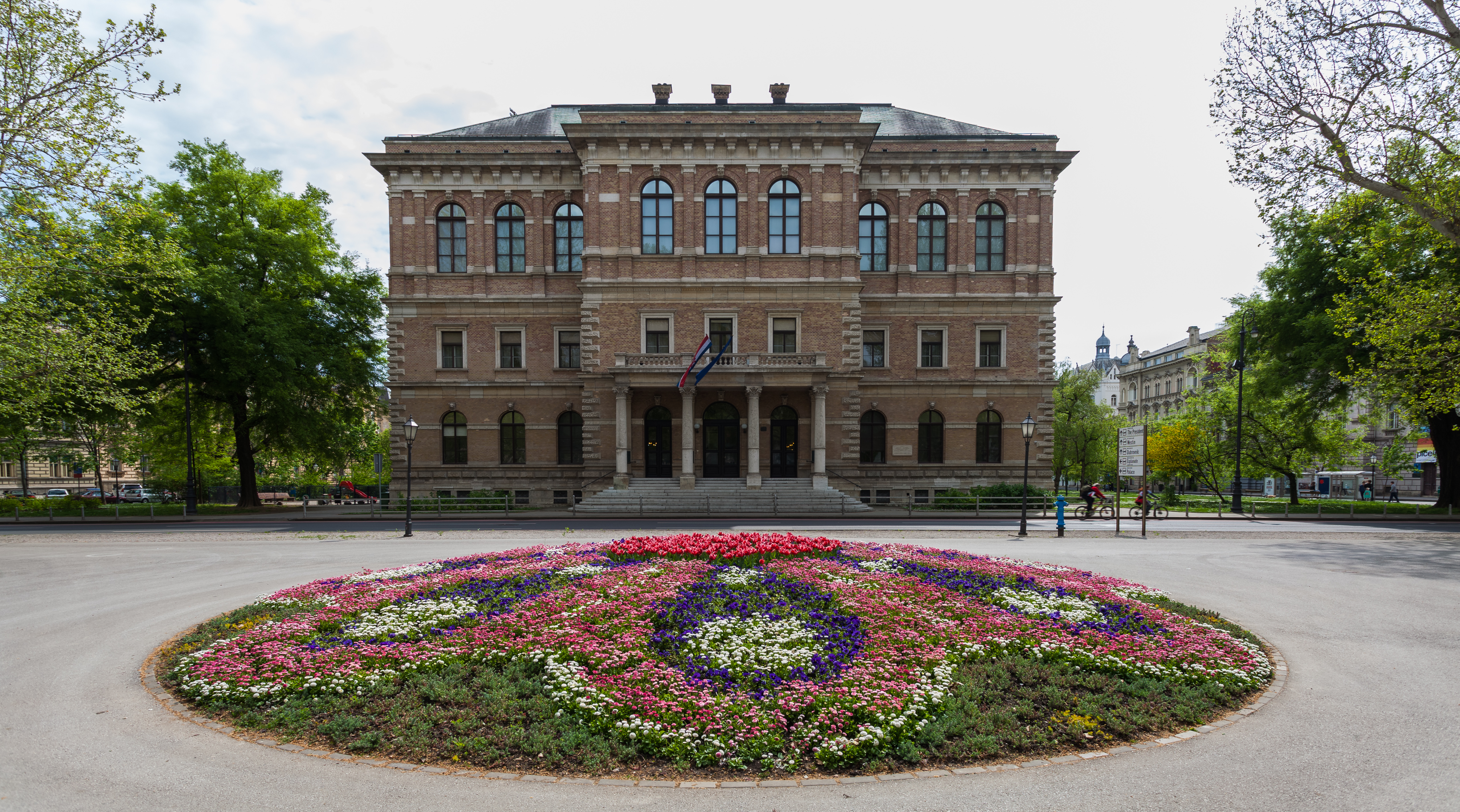
- The building of Croatian Academy of Sciences and Arts where the gallery is located
- Established: 9 September 1884; 142 years ago
- Location: 11 Nikola Šubić Zrinski Square, Zagreb, Croatia
- Type: Art gallery
- Collection size: 4,000 (250 on display)
- Founder: Josip Juraj Strossmayer
- President: Velimir Neidhardt
- Curator: Ljerka Dulibić
- Public transit access: ZET Tram no. 6 & 13
- Website: sgallery.hazu.hr

The Strossmayer Gallery of Old Masters (Croatian: Strossmayerova galerija starih majstora) is a fine art gallery in Zagreb, Croatia exhibiting the collection donated to the city by Bishop Josip Juraj Strossmayer in 1884. Located at 11 Nikola Šubić Zrinski Square, it forms part of the Croatian Academy of Sciences and Arts (Hrvatska akademija znanosti i umjetnosti).

Placed in neo-Renaissance building, The Strossmayer Gallery holds around 4,000 works, of which some 250 are on display, with the remainder in storage, or on display at other museums or gallery institutions in Croatia, and includes the paintings of biggest European masters such as Raphael, El Greco, Carpaccio, Fra Angelico, Gros, Albertinelli, Patinir, Bencovich, Mazzola, Vernet and many others.

== History ==
Initially, since its founding in 1861, the Academy did not have a permanent home and was housed in various locations, including the building of today’s Natural History Museum and later in the People's House on Opatička Street. Over time, with the establishment of the Library and Archives of the Croatian Academy of Sciences and Arts and the donation of artworks in 1868, Bishop Josip Juraj Strossmayer developed the idea of building a dedicated headquarters for the Academy and an Art Gallery. In 1875, the bishop donated 40,000 forints to the Yugoslav Academy of Sciences and Arts for the construction of the Academy's palace, with space for the Strossmayer Gallery of Art.

That same year, Strossmayer entrusted the design of the palace to renowned Viennese architect Friedrich von Schmidt. The first proposed location was rejected due to public disapproval, and in 1876, the city council decided to build the palace on the southern side of Nikola Šubić Zrinski Square. In 1877, Schmidt redesigned the project, with assistance from his pupil, Herman Bollé. The building, designed in the neo-Renaissance style, was larger to accommodate the Archaeological Museum collection. Construction began in the same year, with Bollé overseeing the work. The palace was completed in 1880, and on October 22, the first official session was held there.

However, the building was severely damaged by a major earthquake that year, delaying its official opening. On November 9, 1884, four years after the earthquake, the palace was officially handed over to the administration of the Croatian Academy of Sciences and Arts, and the Strossmayer Gallery was opened to the public in November 1884, named after its founder, Josip Juraj Strossmayer, the bishop of Đakovo. The Academy itself, with the bishop as patron, had been founded in 1866 and had moved into its specially built premises in the Zrinevac park in 1880, with a floor reserved to house the bishop's art collection.

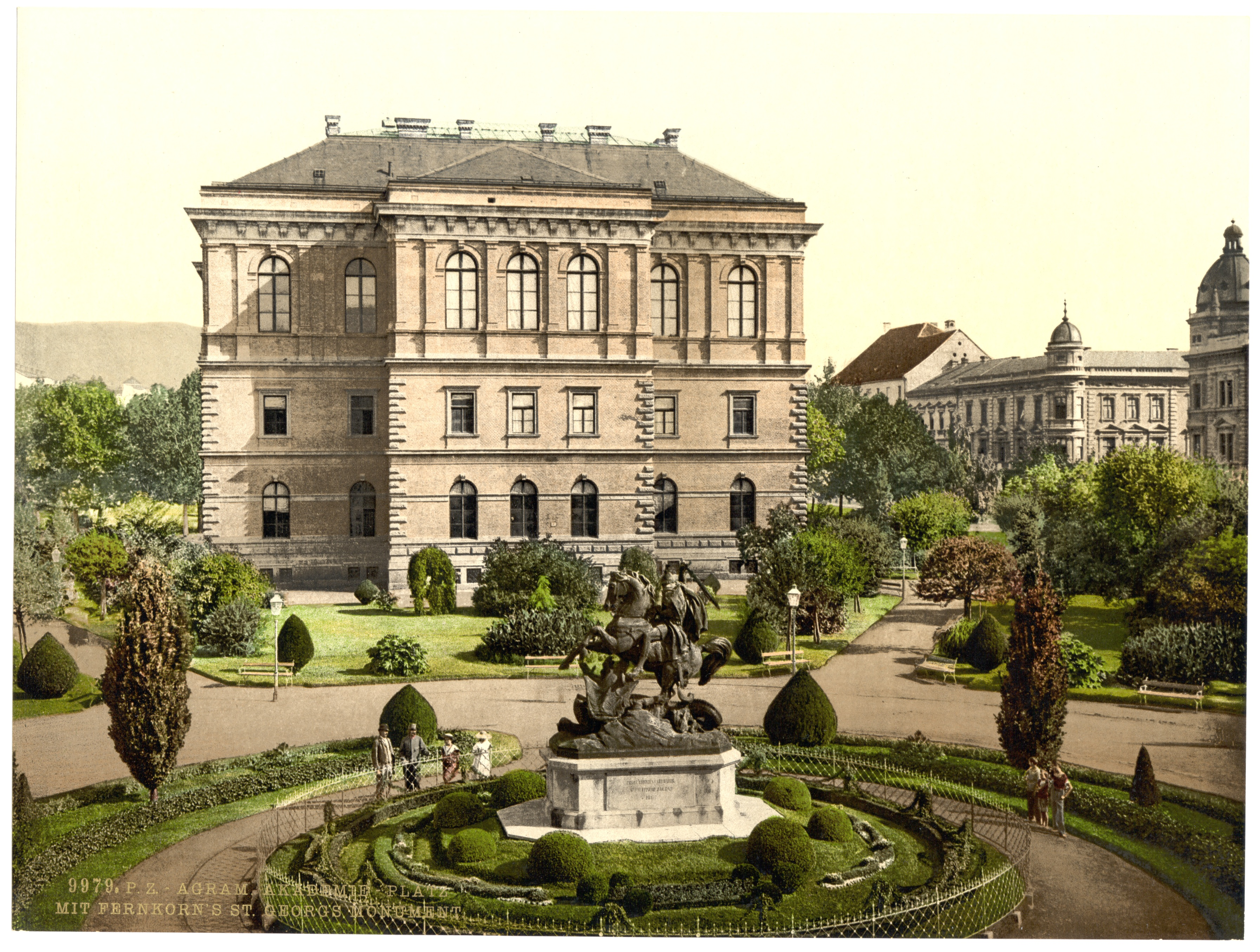
The Academy in 1890s

Bishop Strossmayer had been buying paintings for 30 years, since his appointment as bishop of Đakovo in 1850. He began with Italian art, mainly Renaissance works from Florence and Venice. In the 1870s, however, he diversified into the schools of northern Europe, and 17th-century art. Over the years, such a prestigious collection attracted further donations, including those of contemporary artists. The expansion led in 1934 to the founding of the Modern Gallery to hold the more recent works. Other additions to the collection included acquisitions and donations from notable philanthropists such as Ivan Ružić, Marquis Etienne de Piennes, Ante Topić Mimara and Zlatko Baloković. After the Archaeological Museum moved out in 1945, the staircase began to be redesigned, and in 1947–1948 architect Ivo Župan reorganized both the exterior and interior staircases, widened access to the first floor, and opened the atrium to connect the interior with Zrinjevac Park. During this period, the galleries, atrium, and entrance areas were paved with stone and the columns were clad in stone. Later renovations included the expansion of the exterior staircase in 1982 and a full restoration of the palace in 2000, when damaged stone elements and façade decorations were replaced.

In 2020, the art gallery building was damaged by a strong earthquake, and is closed as of August 2025 due to repairs.

== Collections ==
The Strossmayer Gallery exhibits the works of European painters from 14th-19th century. The holdings have been classified into three major groups: Italian, French and Northern European (German, Flemish and Dutch) works, and also some works by Croatian artists. They were given the collective name of Schiavoni, deriving from the Italian name for Slavs. Although born on the eastern shore of the Adriatic, their lives and work were associated with Italy.

In addition to the paintings in the gallery, the Academy building also houses the Baška Tablet (Bašćanska ploča), the oldest known example of Glagolitic script, dating from 1102. A large statue of Bishop Strossmayer by Ivan Meštrović is located in the park behind the academy.

== Gallery ==
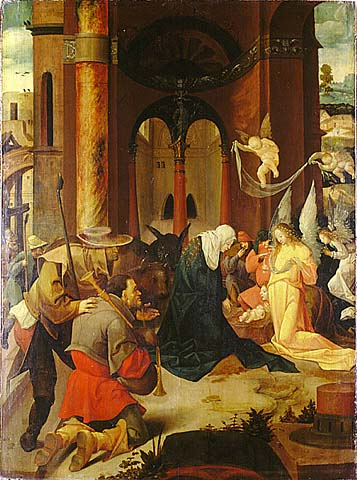
The Birth of Christ by Jan Wellens de Cock, 1470–1520

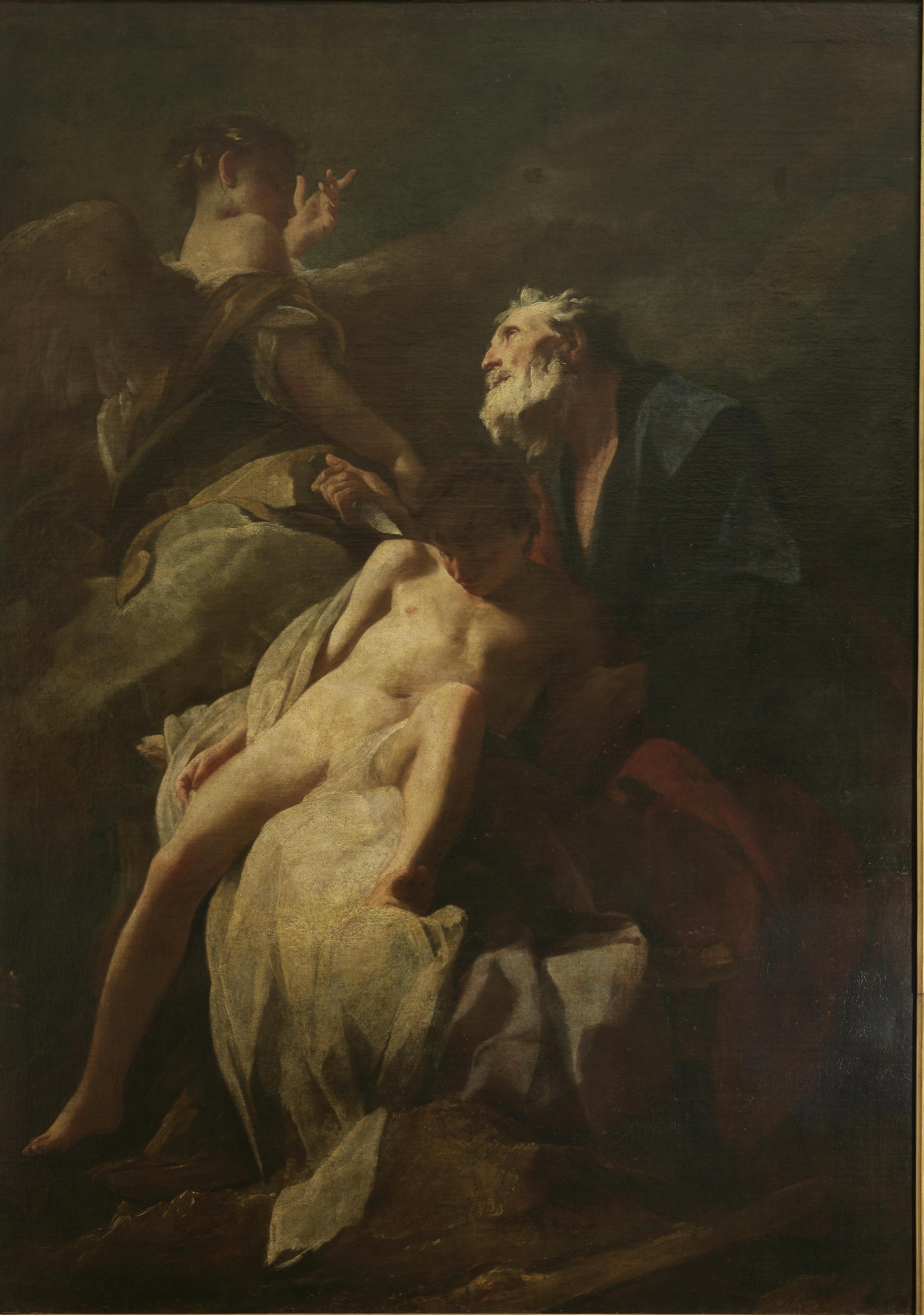
Abraham's Sacrifice of Isaac by Federico Bencovich, 1715

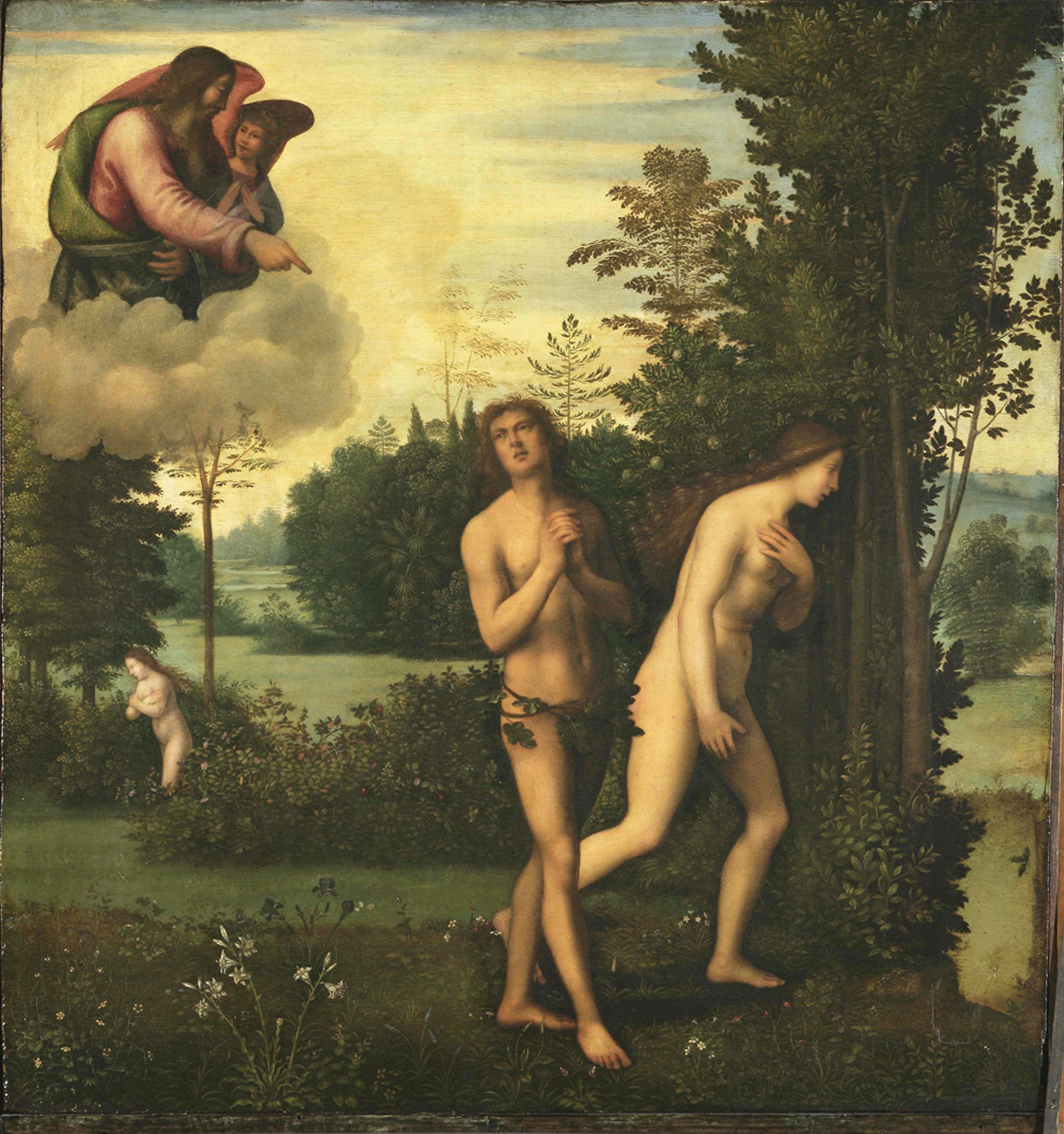
The Expulsion of Adam and Eve from Paradise, Mariotto Albertinelli, 1514

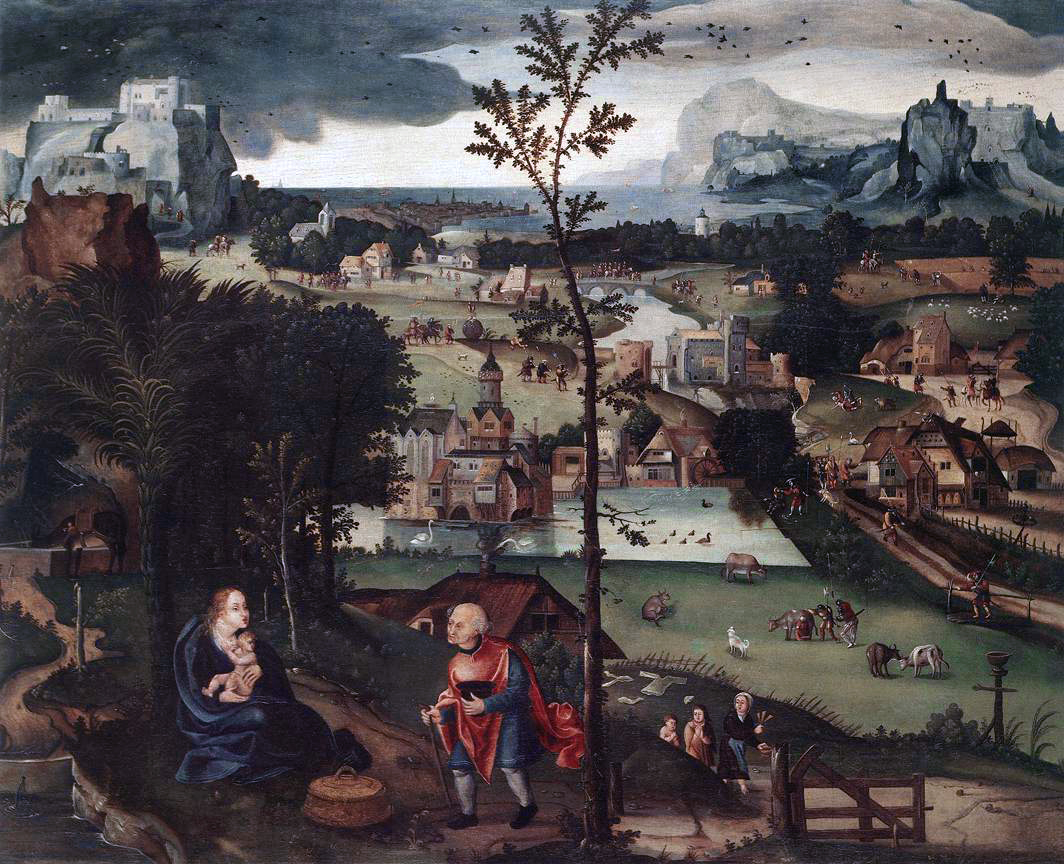
Landscape with the Rest on the Flight, Joachim Patinir, 1750s

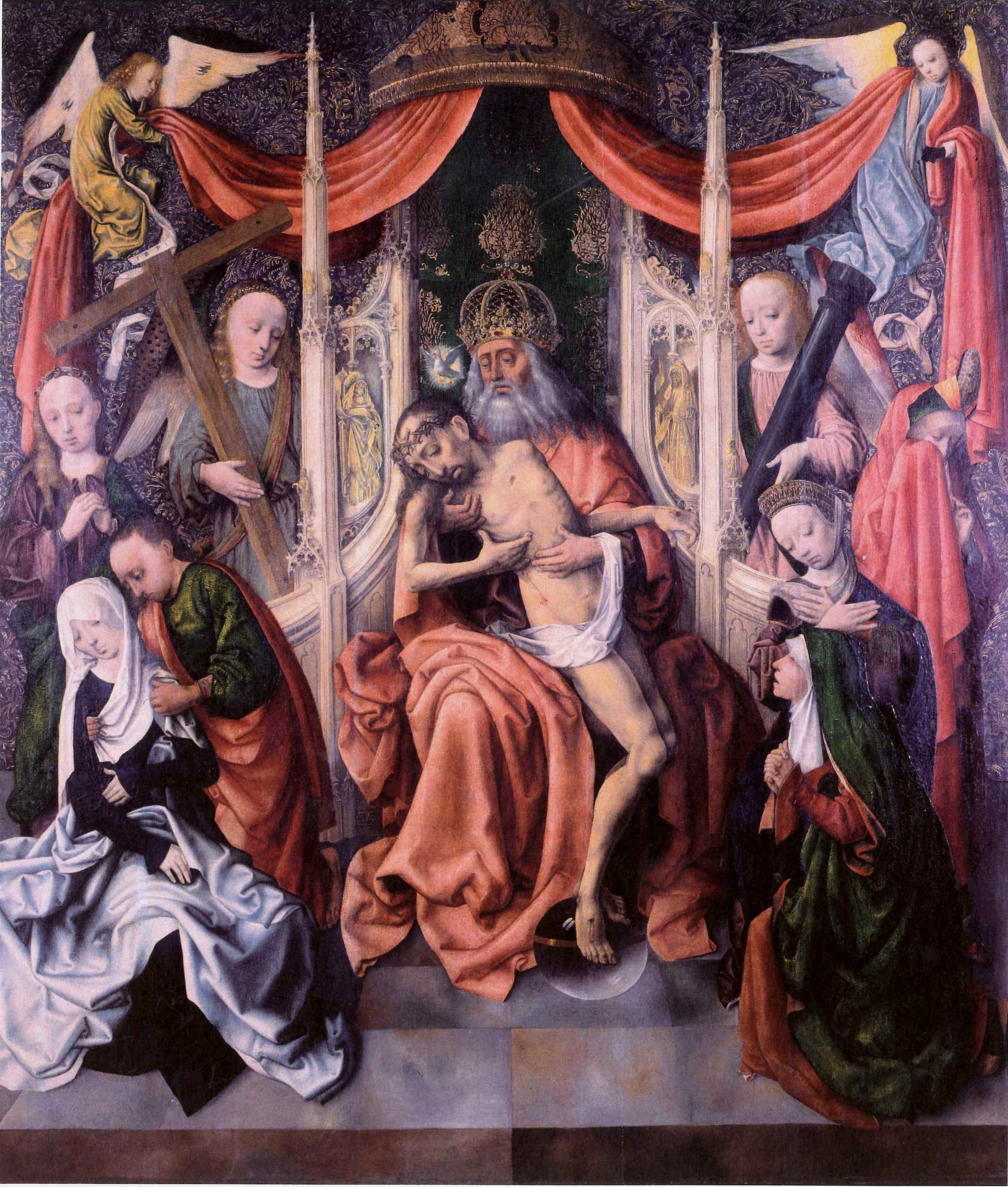
Throne of Mercy, Master of the Virgo inter Virgines, 1485–1495

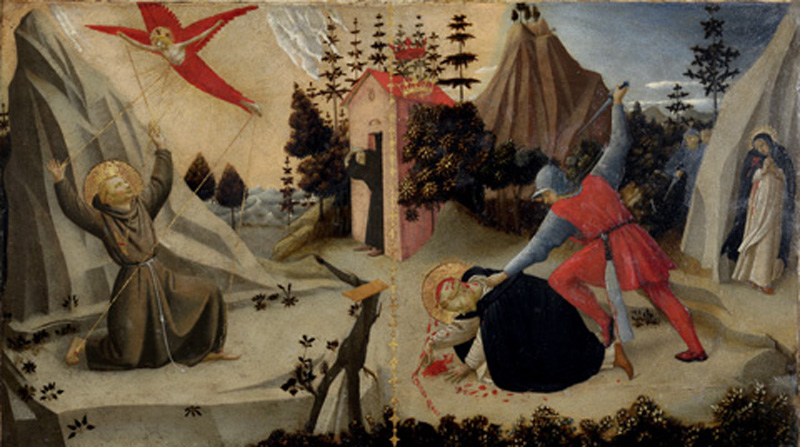
Stigmatization of St Francis of Assisi and Death of St Peter the Martyr, Fra Angelico, 1395–1455

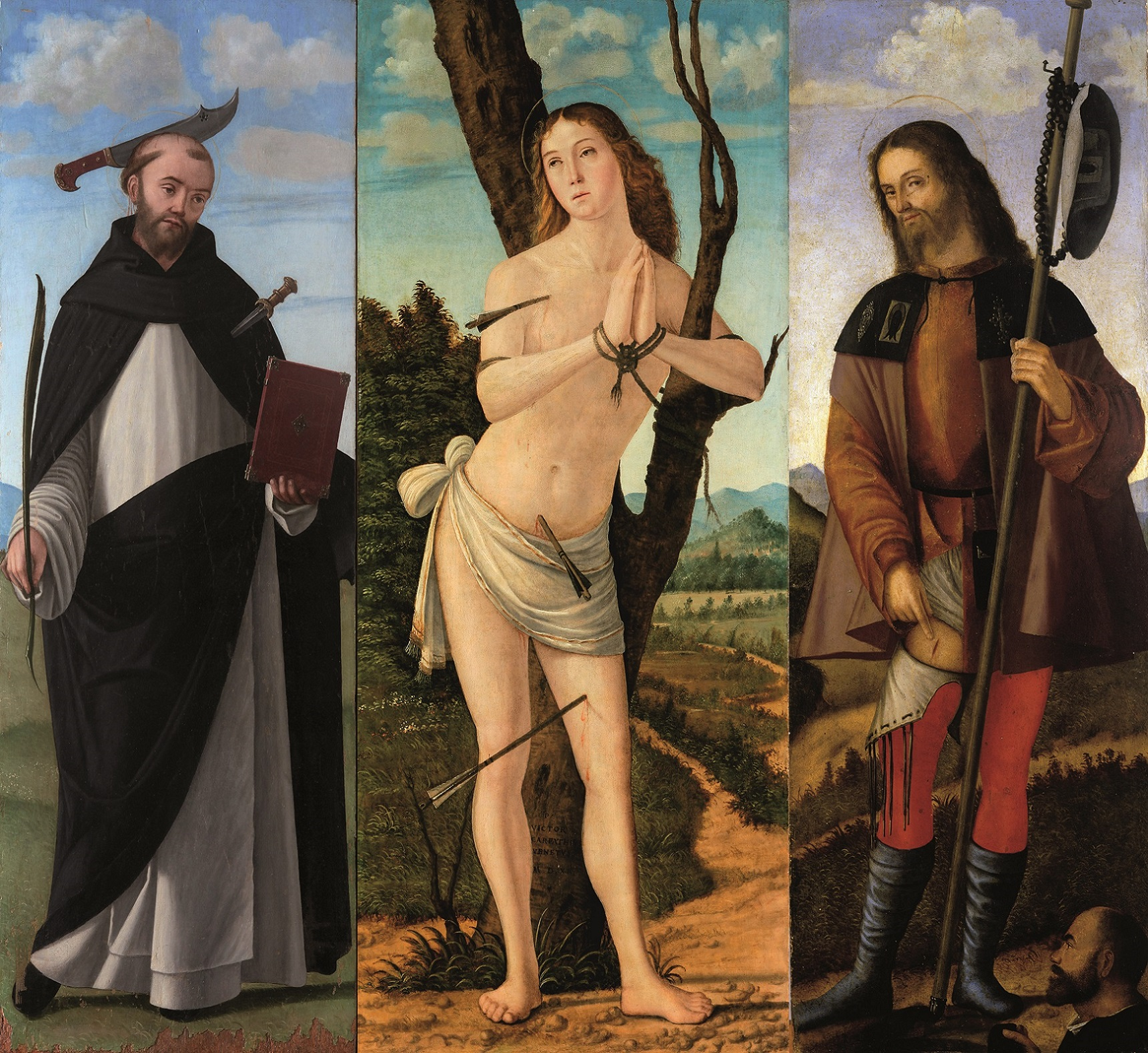
Trittico di Santa Fosca, San Pietro Martire, Museo Correr, Venezia San Sebastiano, Vittore Carpaccio, 15th–16th century

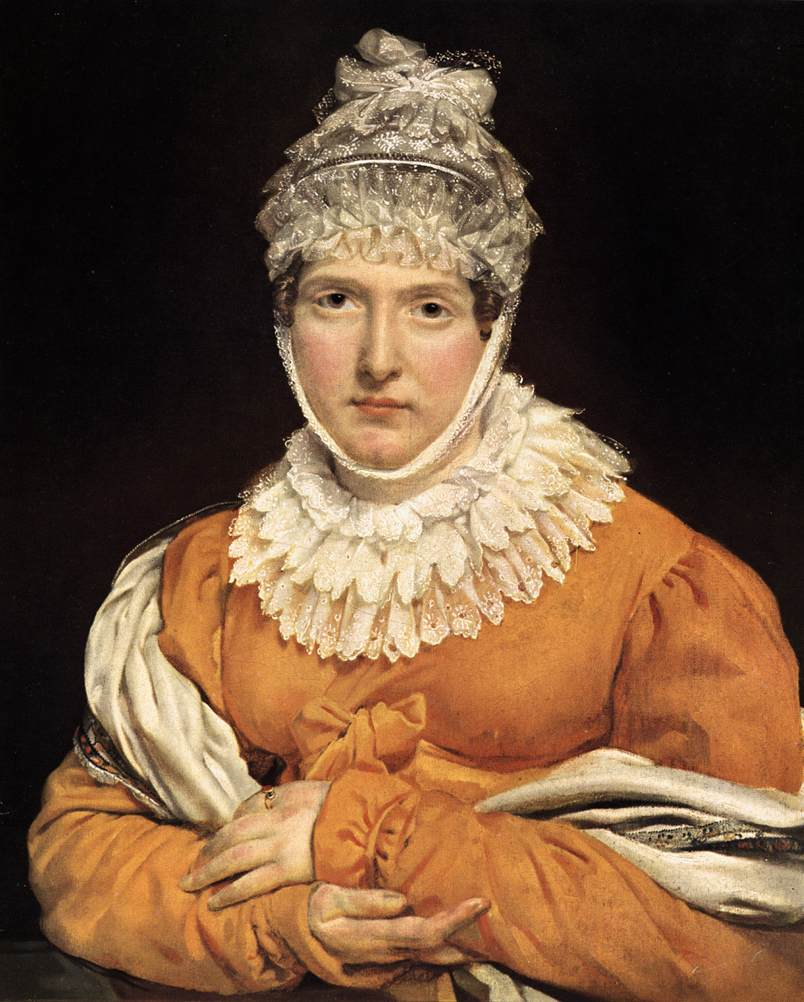
Portrait of Madame Récamier by Antoine-Jean Gros, 1825

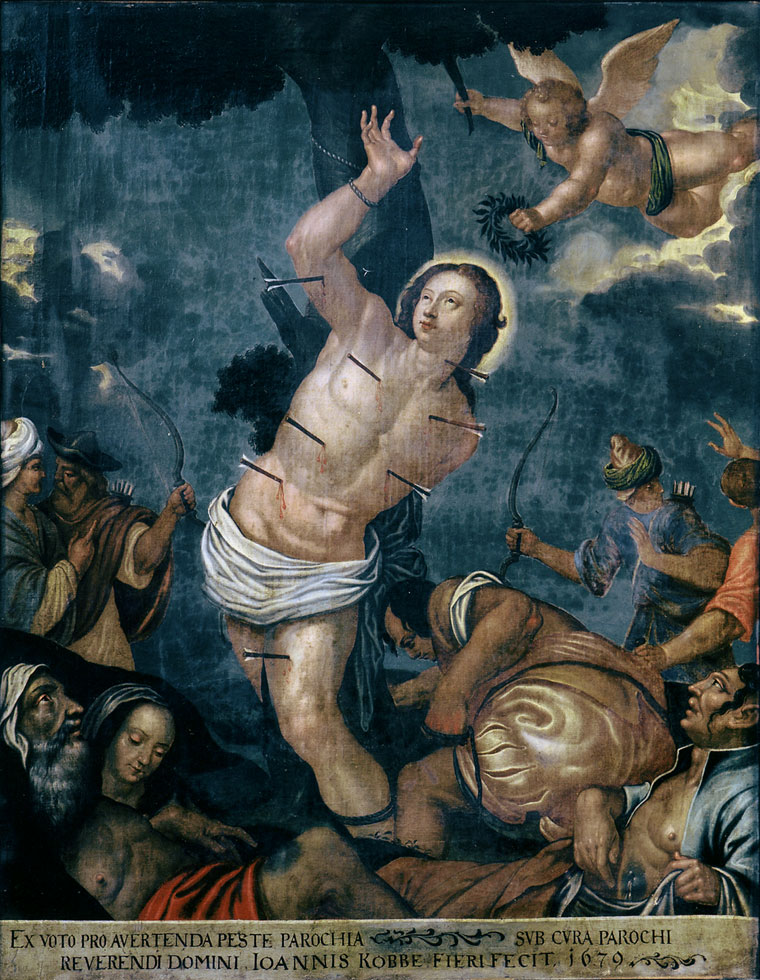
The Martyrdom of Saint Boštjan by Hans Georg Geiger a Geigerfeld, 1679

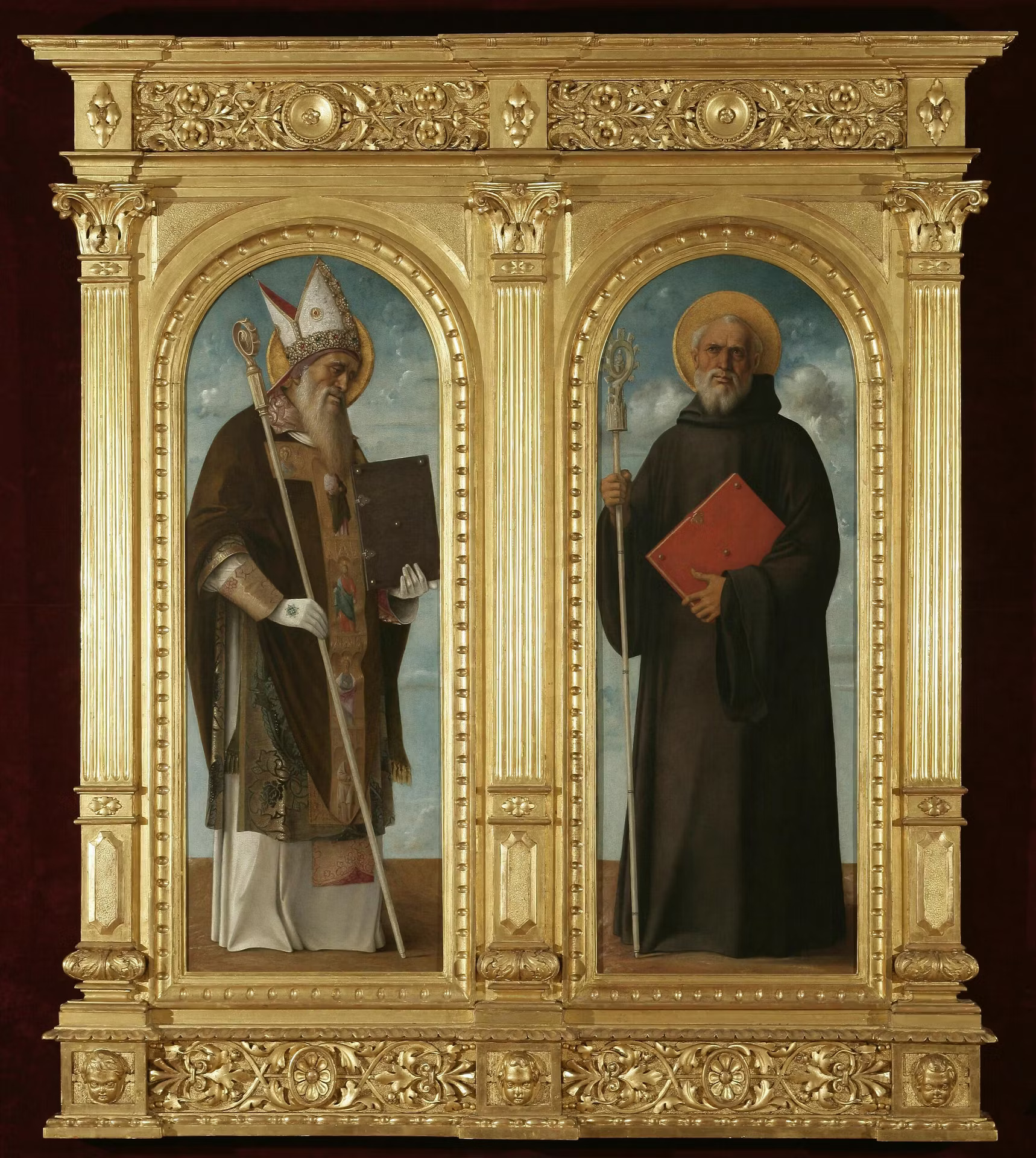
Saint Benedict and Saint Augustine by Giovanni Bellini, ca. 1490

== See also ==
- Modern Gallery, Zagreb
- Museum of Contemporary Art, Zagreb
- Croatian Museum of Naïve Art
- List of museums in Croatia
