= Jean-Antoine Gros =

French painter (1732–1790)

Jean-Antoine Gros (1732–1790) was a French painter, father of Antoine-Jean Gros.

Born in Toulouse, Gros married Félicité Labille in 1764, becoming the brother-in-law of Adélaïde Labille-Guiard. She died four years later, and in 1770 he remarried, to the painter Pierrette-Madeleine-Cécile Durand. He was active as a miniaturist and pastellist during his career. Some sources give his date of birth as 1725.
