= The Departure of Louis XVIII from the Tuileries Palace =

Painting by Antoine-Jean Gros

- Artist: Antoine-Jean Gros
- Year: 1817
- Type: Oil on canvas, history painting
- Dimensions: 405 cm × 525 cm (159 in × 207 in)
- Location: Palace of Versailles; Versailles

The Departure of Louis XVIII from the Tuileries Palace (French: Adieux de Louis XVIII quittant le palais des Tuileries) is a large oil on canvas history painting by the French artist Antoine-Jean Gros, from 1817.

== History and description ==
It depicts the hurried departure of the French king Louis XVIII from the Tuileries Palace in Paris on the night of 20 March 1815 following Napoleon's escape from exile on Elba. As the deposed French Emperor advanced on the capital Louis headed north to Belgium and established a government in exile at Ghent close to the forces of the Duke of Wellington. After the Hundred Days campaign Louis was restored to the throne with the support of Allied forces.

The painting was commissioned by Louis XVIII in 1816 for 10,000 Francs and displayed at the Salon of 1817 at the Louvre in Paris. Today it is in the collection of the Palace of Versailles.

== Bibliography ==
- Crow, Thomas. Restoration: The Fall of Napoleon in the Course of European Art, 1812-1820. Princeton University Press, 2023.
- Mansel, Philip. Louis XVIII. John Murray, 2005.
- Reymert, Martin L.H. Ingres & Delacroix Through Degas & Puvis de Chavannes: The Figure in French Art, 1800-1870. The Gallery, 1975.
