= Félix Louis Leullier =

French painter

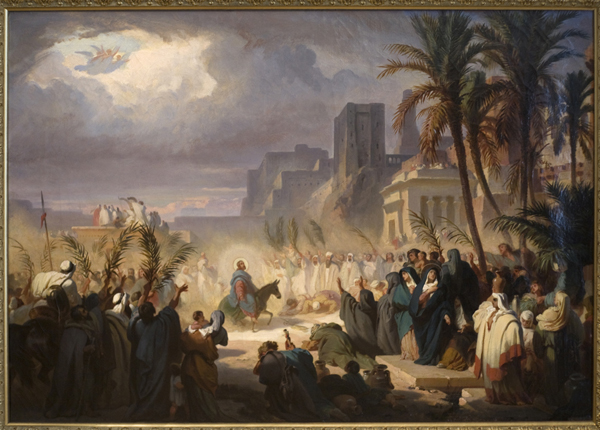
Christ's triumphal entry into Jerusalem.

Félix Louis Leullier (1811 – 1882 in Paris) was a French painter who painted mostly religious subjects. He studied under the Romantic artist Antoine-Jean Gros.
