= Portrait of Madame Récamier (Gros) =

Painting by Antoine-Jean Gros

- Portrait de Madame Récamier (French)
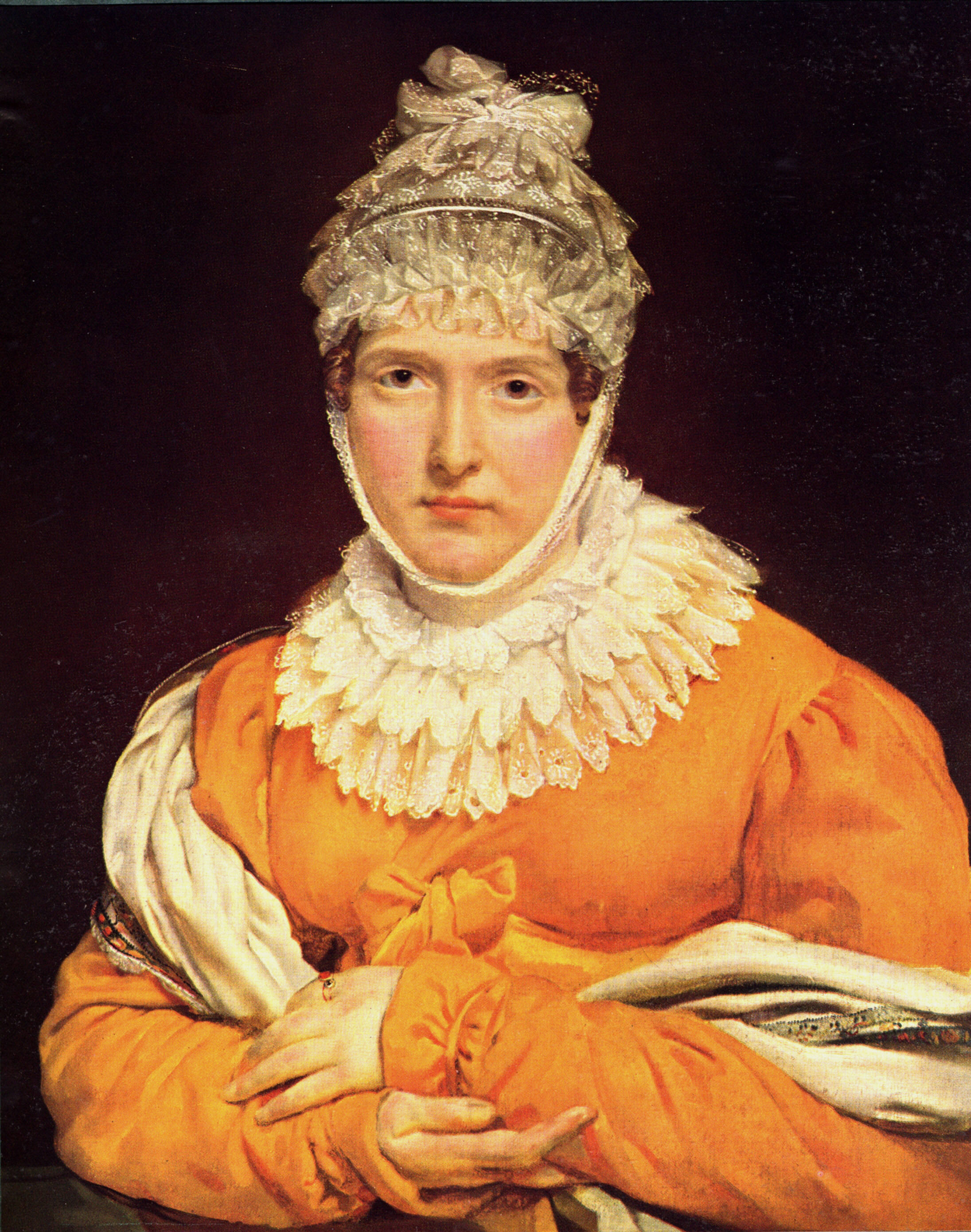
- Artist: Antoine-Jean Gros
- Year: 1825
- Medium: Oil on canvas
- Dimensions: 62.3 cm × 51.2 cm (24.5 in × 20.2 in)
- Location: Strossmayer Gallery of Old Masters, Zagreb

Portrait of Madame Recamier (French: Portrait de Madame Récamier ) is an oil on canvas painting by French artist Antoine-Jean Gros from about 1825. It is held at the Strossmayer Gallery of Old Masters, in Zagreb.

== Description ==
The portrait presents Madame Recamier in her middle age. A great beauty of her time, she had been portrayed in her youth by Jacques-Louis David and François Gérard, at a time when she was leading a cosmopolitan life in Paris while residing at the consulate in the city. She was known for her lavish soirees at the Palace of Rue Mont Blanc, which were attended by contemporary artists, writers, actors and politicians. The portrait was painted later, but still shows her fair features and graceful hands folded under her chest.

== Provenance ==
The painting was exhibited in Strossmayer Gallery, in Zagreb. It is owned by the Croatian Academy of Sciences and Arts, in Zagreb. It was donated in 1903 by French nobleman Eugène-Emmanuel-Ernst Halvin, Marquis Penn.
