= Hercules and Diomedes =

Painting by Antoine-Jean Gros

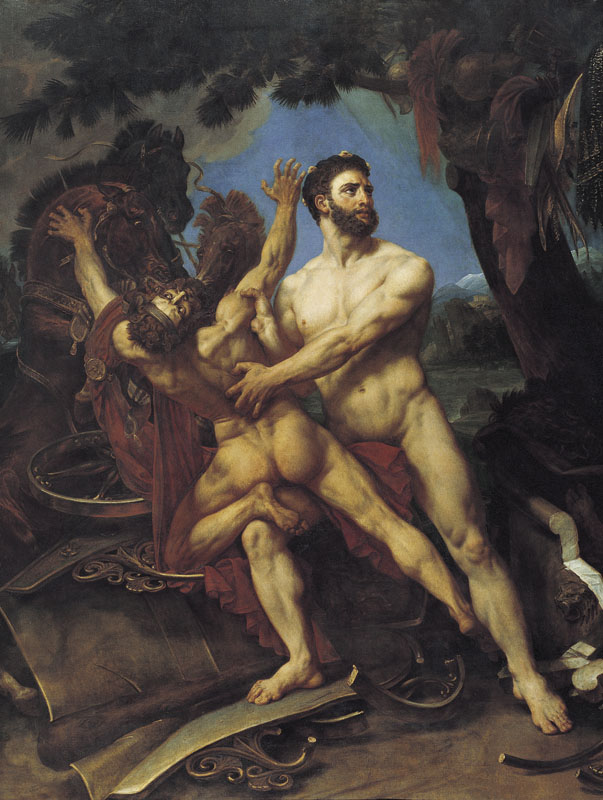
- Artist: Antoine-Jean Gros
- Year: 1835
- Type: Oil on canvas
- Dimensions: 426 cm × 324 cm (168 in × 128 in)
- Location: Musée des Augustins; Toulouse

Hercules and Diomedes (French: Hercule et Diomède) is an 1835 oil painting by the French artist Antoine-Jean Gros. It depicts two figures from Ancient Greek Mythology, Heracles and Diomedes. Gros, a former pupil of Jacques-Louis David, was a proponent of Neoclassicism and sharply opposed to the rising trend of Romanticism.

The painting was exhibited at the Salon of 1835 at the Louvre in Paris. The poor reception of the painting there seems to have led him to commit suicide the same year. Today it is in the collection of the Musée des Augustins in Toulouse, having been acquired in 1836.

== Bibliography ==
- Allard, Sébastien & Fabre, Côme. Delacroix. Metropolitan Museum of Art, 2018.
- Elkins, James. Pictures and Tears: A History of People Who Have Cried in Front of Paintings. Routledge, 2005.
- Jacobus, Lee A. Humanities: The Evolution of Values. McGraw-Hill, 1986.
- May, Gita. Elisabeth Vigée Le Brun: The Odyssey of an Artist in an Age of Revolution. Yale University Press, 2008.
