= The Battle of Nazareth (Gros) =

Painting by Antoine-Jean Gros

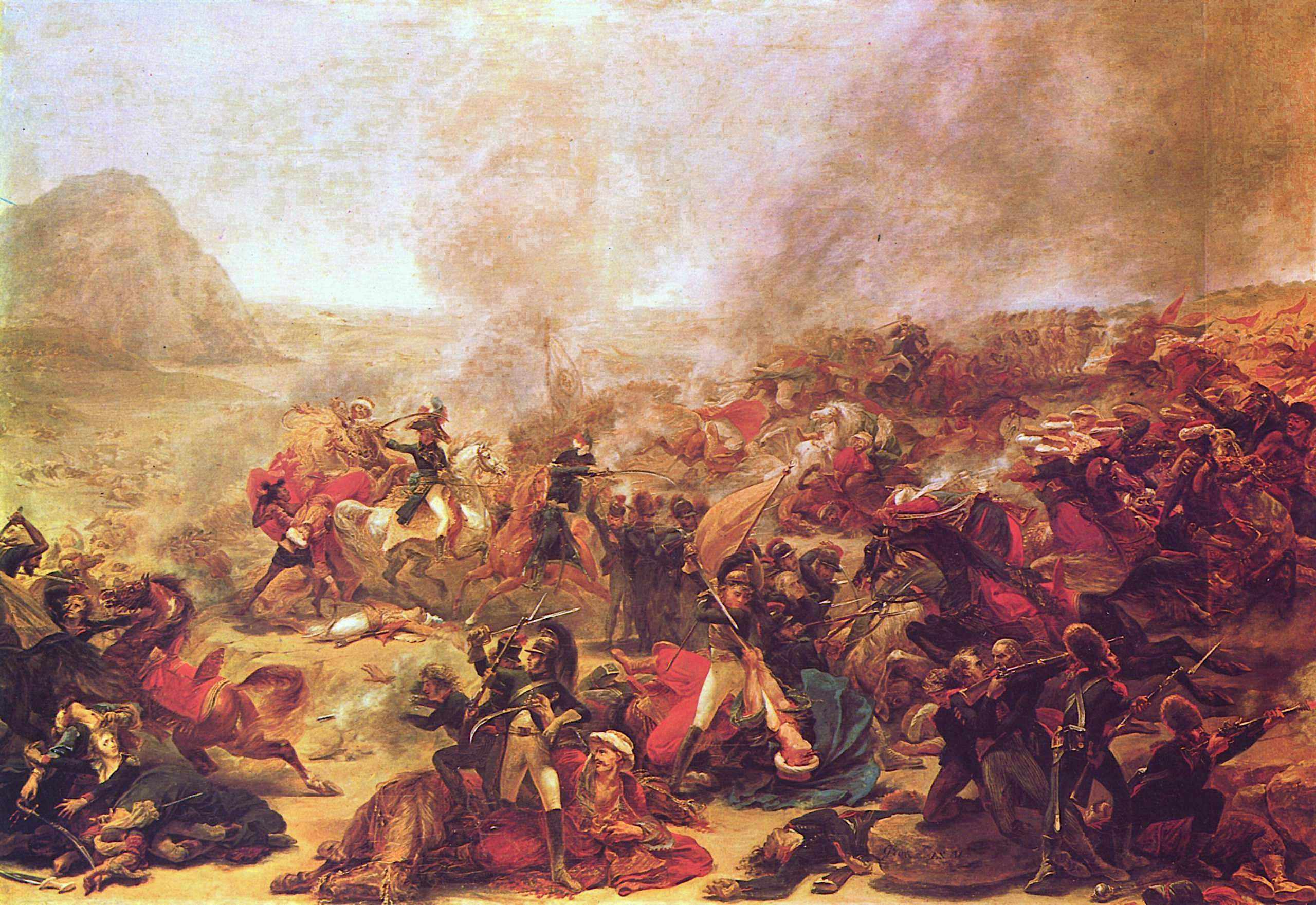
- Artist: Antoine-Jean Gros
- Year: 1801
- Medium: Oil on canvas
- Dimensions: 135 cm × 196 cm (53 in × 77 in)
- Location: Musée d'Arts de Nantes, Nantes

The Battle of Nazareth is an oil on canvas painting by French painter Antoine-Jean Gros, from 1801. It represents the French Army, led by General Andoche Junot, in a battle where he defeated the Ottoman army during the Egyptian campaign of Napoleon. It is held at the Musée d'Arts de Nantes.

== History ==
In 1800, the year after the victory of French troops over the Ottomans near the village of Nazareth, in Palestine, at April 8, 1799, a jury attributed the realization of a commemorative work of the event to Antoine-Jean Gros. A sketch for the final work was presented at the Salon of 1801. The painting was going to have large dimensions. Gros was going to be execute it, after making the original sketch, when the First Consul Napoleon Bonaparte ordered that his size was to be considerably reduced, since the final work was meant to have 8 m in length. It is believed that Napoleon didn't want too much publicity for the hero of the fight, for political reasons, since Junot was overtly republican. On the unused canvas, Gros would paint one of his master works, Bonaparte Visiting the Plague Victims of Jaffa, completed in 1804.

== Description ==
The painting depicts Junot, at the left and in profile, riding his white horse, in the moment when he kills a Mamluk with a pistol shot to his head, and, with his sword, he wounds another Ottoman soldier, while the son of the former Pasha of Acre is at his feet. Two brigade leaders, honoured by Bonaparte after the battle are also shown. In front of Junot, brigade leader Paul Desnoyers is seen riding a Norman bay horse, and the future General Duvivier rides a black horse, charging at the head of his dragoons at the top right of the canvas. Soldiers receive with bayonets the fiery charge of an Ottoman horseman, who rushes at them at a gallop, his arms crossed, with a sort an apparent fatalistic resignation. In the background, are depicted Mount Tabor and the village of Cana.

== Analysis ==
The Battle of Nazareth is a battle scene that tries to capture the movement and the ardor of the action taking place. The heat of the battle is depicted in yellow colors. There are effects of realism, like the soldiers who look outside the canvas, in opposition to neoclassicism. The soldiers are seen on the same scale as the general, there is an absence of a center in the painting, and a certain disorder in this battle. In the center, a French soldier and Ottoman tear off a standard, while their downed horses had not yet had time to get up. The left side of the canvas is occupied by a small group of lone soldiers, surrounded by corpses and heroically defending themselves against a swarm of enemy horsemen. All these groups are linked by the skillful arrangement of the main lines of the composition, and by the harmony of a sustained color. The exactness of the strategic layouts and the topography, the realism of the portraits, the costumes, and the oriental light, which bathes the whole canvas, obscured in some places by clouds of powder, make this painting one of the most accomplished of Gros. The painter depicts in this canvas the violence of the battle, noticed in the gruesome details, in opposition to the neoclassicism of his master Jacques-Louis David. The strong presence of the red color reinforces the feeling of blood and violence in the painting.

== Provenance ==
Although only a sketch, the work aroused the admiration of artists like Théodore Géricault, who even made a copy of it, and Eugène Delacroix. Acquired by a private individual, the canvas ended up in the collections of the Musée d'Arts de Nantes in 1854, where it has been since then.
