= Arthur d'Echérac =

French sculptor and writer (1832–1919)

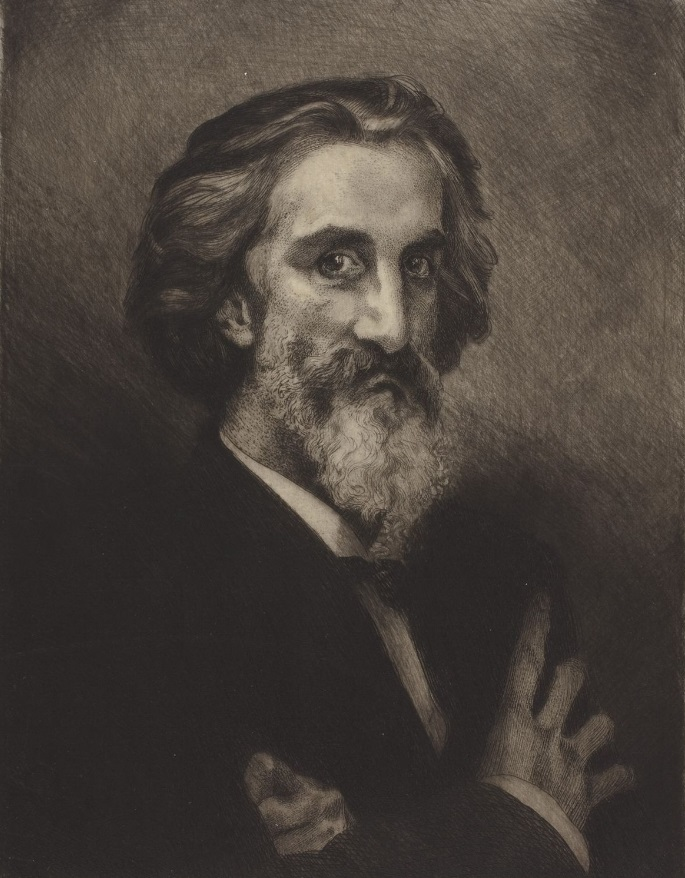
Arthur d'Échérac in 1883

Arthur Auguste Mallebay du Cluzeau d'Échérac (26 February 1832 – 22 August 1919), known by the pseudonym G. Dargenty, was a French journalist, art critic, writer and sculptor.

== Career ==
Arthur d'Échérac was born in Guéret and had a younger brother, Pierre-Albert. His father was a prefect of Louis Philippe I and a member of the Society of Natural and Archaeological Sciences of Creuse. The family later moved to Angoulême, where Arthur was a student at the Lycée Guez-de-Balzac and the Lycée in Poitiers. After his mother died, he attended and graduated in law from the Faculty of Law of Paris. He entered the Préfecture de la Seine in 1860 and joined the Public Assistance services. He progressed in the administration and ended up as Inspector General from 1882 to 1896.

At the same time, he had an interest in sculpture, studying under Jean Gautherin. He exhibited at the Salon des artistes français from 1870 to 1889. He worked on medallions or busts of contemporary figures such as Georges Clemenceau, Léon Cladel, Ferdinand Fabre and Michel Möring.

He founded and wrote the review L'Art ornamental from 1884 to 1889 and collaborated as an art critic in many newspapers and reviews such as L'Art, Courrier de l'art, La Revue française, La République French, Justice, Le Temps, Canton of Sèvres, Journal of Versailles, The Republic of Letters, and the Literary and artistic review. Under the pseudonym of G. Dargenty, he published about ten books in the field of art.

He held the office of mayor of Sèvres twice, from 1886 to 1889 and from 1898 to 1900. In 1901, he was a member of the Société d'anthropologie de Paris. In 1885, he was named a Knight of the Legion of Honour.

== Personal life ==
In 1876, he married Mrs. Honorine-Louise Faucon and produced a daughter who would later marry Baron Hugues de Nielly. Arthur d'Échérac died in Paris on August 22, 1919, at the age of 87. He is buried in Paris, in the Montparnasse Cemetery (19th division).

== Selected publications ==
- G. Dargenty, Le Roman d'un exilé, tome 2 : roman de mœurs et études sociales, Paris, Éditions Alphonse Lemerre, 1872.
- G. Dargenty, Eugène Delacroix, par lui-même, Éditions J. Rouam, 1885.
- G. Dargenty, Le Baron Gros, Paris, Librairie de l'Art, 1887.
- G. Dargenty, Antoine Watteau, Paris, Librairie de l'Art, 1891.
- Arthur d'Échérac, L'Assistance publique: ce qu'elle fut, ce qu'elle est, Paris, Éditions Georges Steinheil, 1909.

== Sculpture ==
- Paris:
  - cimetière du Montparnasse:
    - 6e division : Louis Asseline, médaillon en bronze ornant le monument funéraire de l'homme de lettres;
    - 15e division : Michel Möring, buste en bronze;
    - 19e division : Auguste Coudereau, médaillon en bronze ornant le monument funéraire du pharmacien.
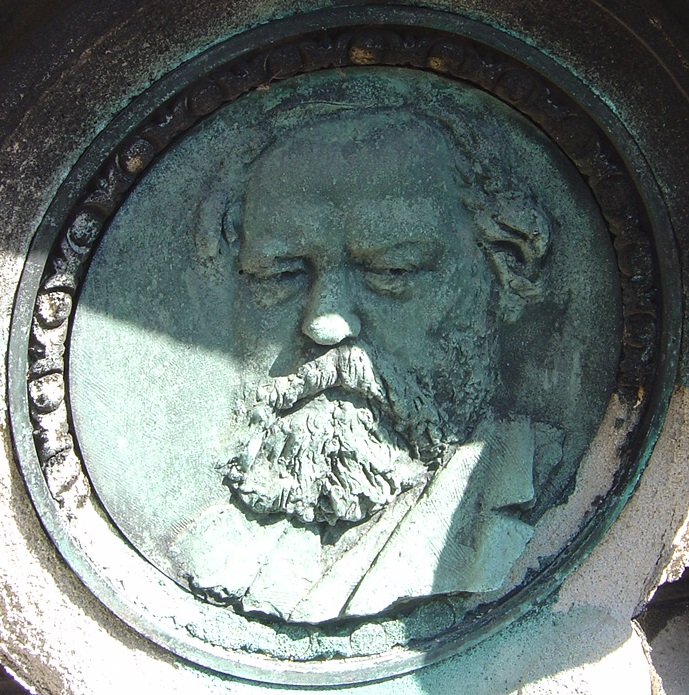
Louis Asseline, bronze medallion, Paris, Montparnasse Cemetery.

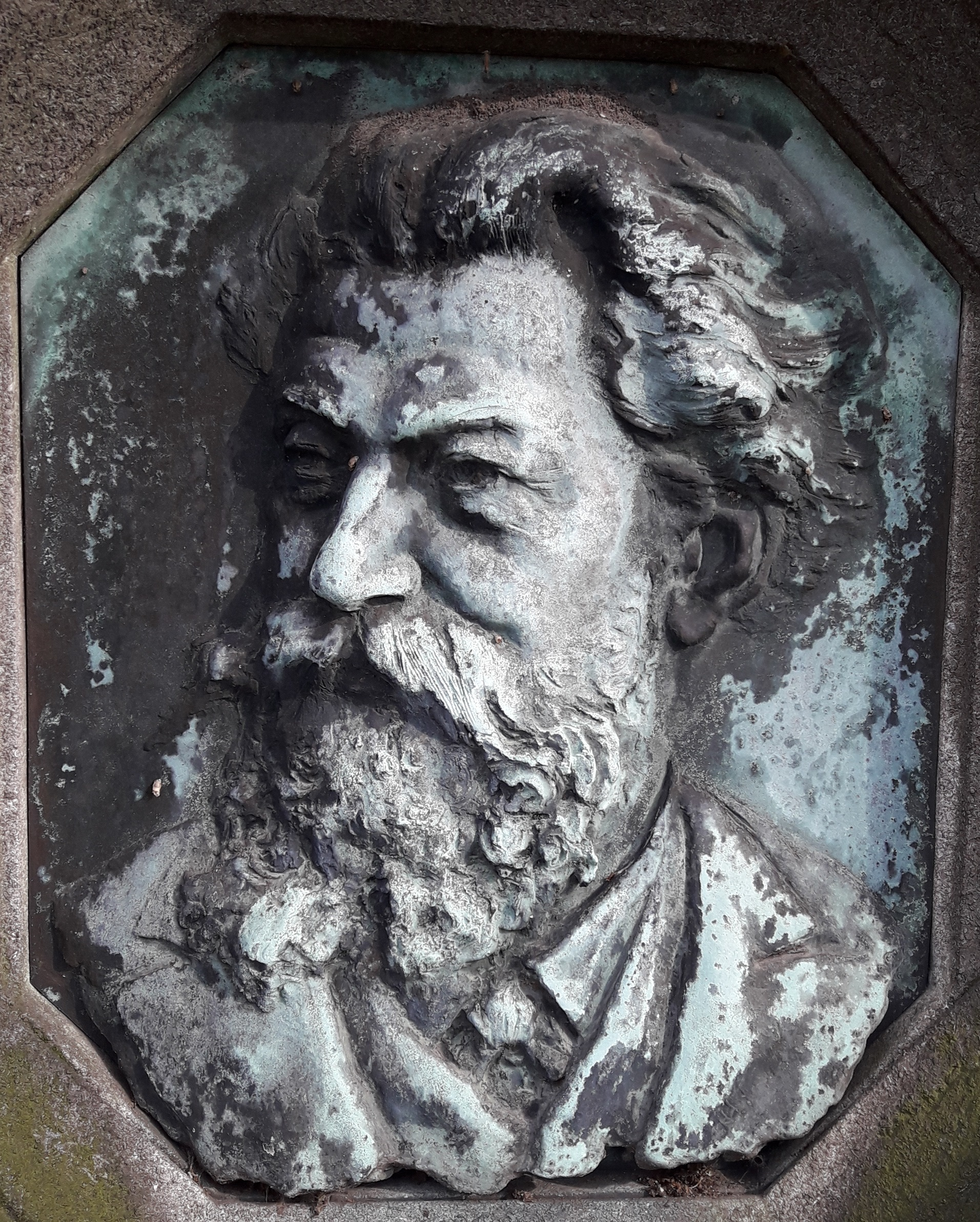
Auguste Coudereau, bronze medallion, Paris, Montparnasse Cemetery.
