= Bonaparte at the Pont d'Arcole =

1796 painting by Antoine-Jean Gros

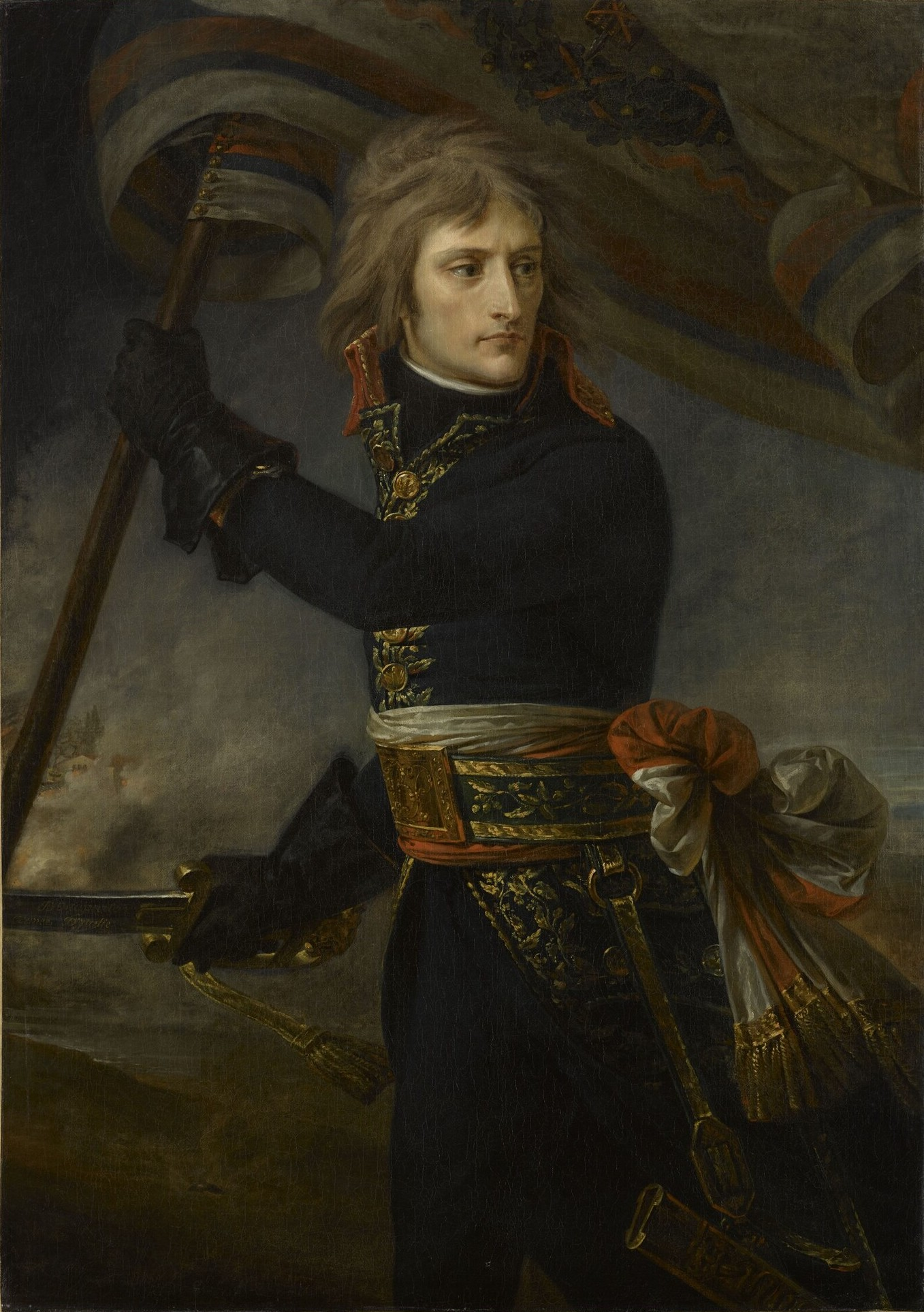
- Artist: Antoine-Jean Gros
- Year: 1796
- Medium: Oil on canvas
- Dimensions: 130 cm × 94 cm (51 in × 37 in)
- Location: Palace of Versailles, Versailles

Bonaparte at the Pont d’Arcole (French: Bonaparte au Pont d’Arcole) is an oil-on-canvas painting executed in 1796 by the French artist Antoine-Jean Gros. It depicts an episode during the Battle of Arcole in November 1796, with General Napoleon Bonaparte leading his troops to storm the bridge.

== Description ==
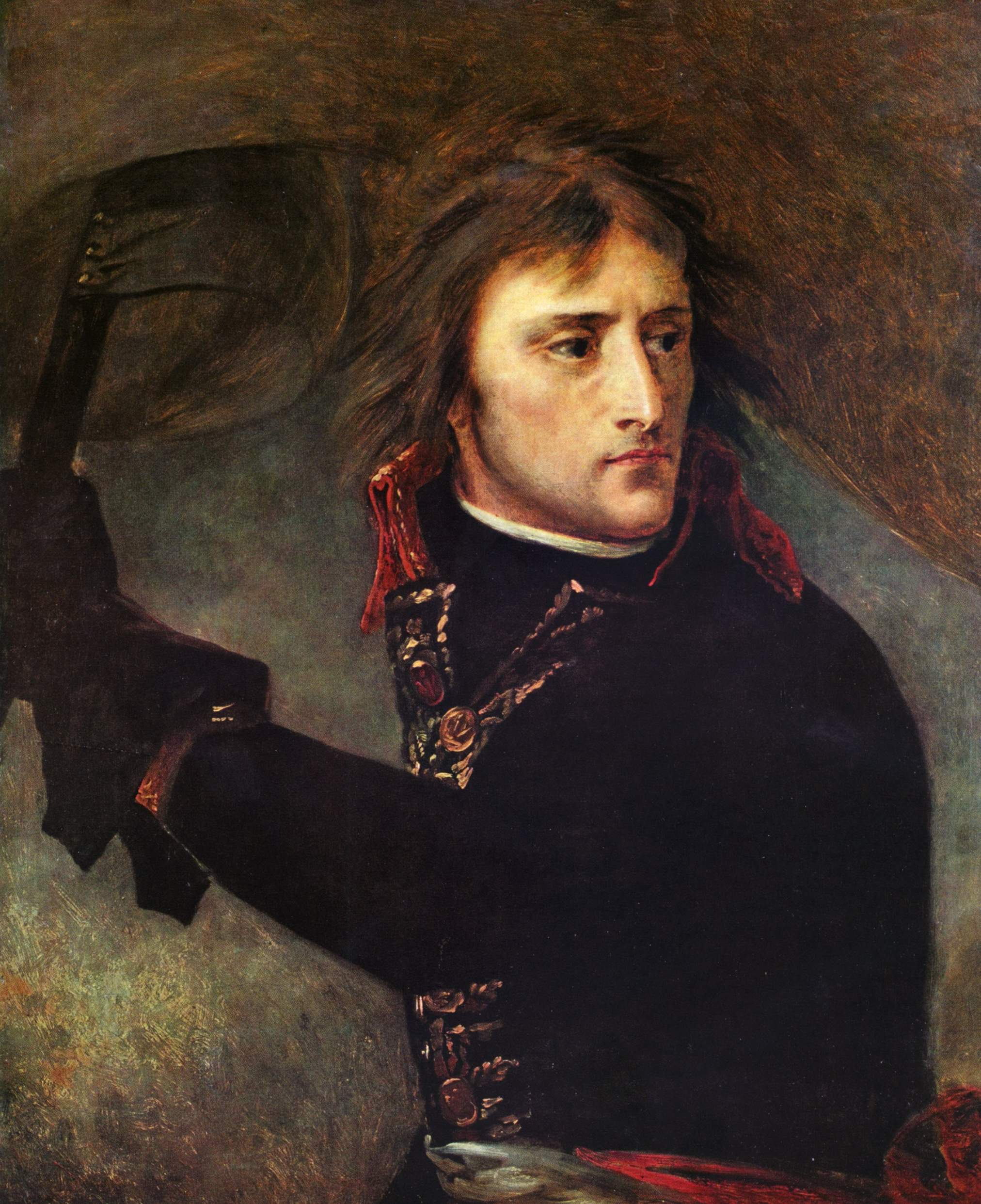
Bonaparte au pont d'Arcole, preparatory study of 1796 for the Versailles portrait (Paris Musée du Louvre), considered superior to the final painting

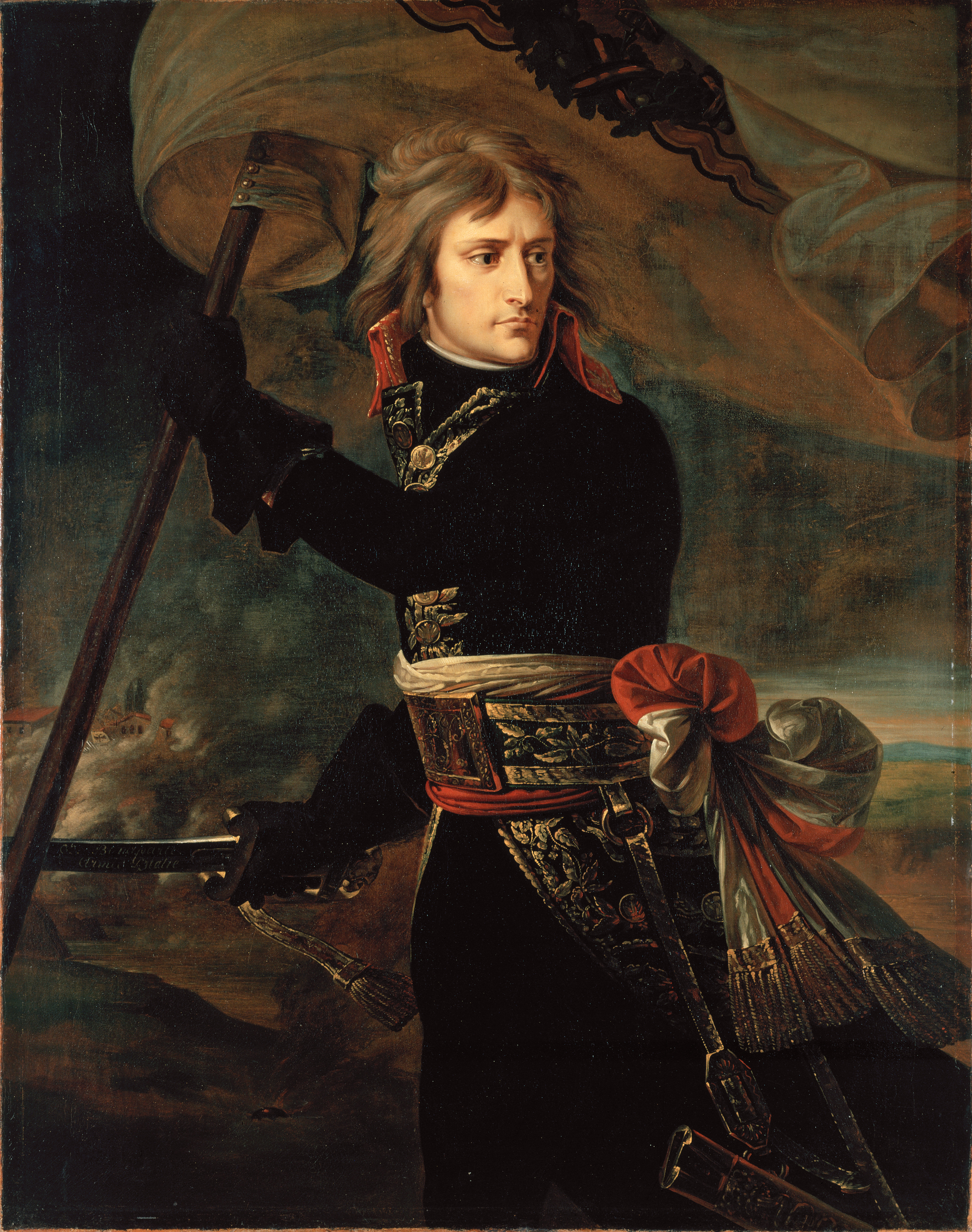
Version in the Hermitage Museum, St Petersburg

The painting presents a three-quarter-length image of Bonaparte, holding the flagstaff of the Armée d'Italie in his left hand and his sword in his right – on its blade is the inscription Bonaparte, Armée d'Italie. He is dressed in the dark blue trousers and tunic of a general of the French First Republic, with a gold-embroidered red collar. Beneath them he wears a white shirt and a black neckscarf. He also wears a gold-fringed tricolor cummerbund and a square-buckled belt bearing his empty scabbard. The background suggests the smoke of battle, with a few houses in the distance on the left. The land bordering the river is painted in dark tones, with a smoking cannonball still visible.

== History ==
Painted in Naples in 1796, the painting was commissioned by Joséphine de Beauharnais, who was accompanying Napoleon in his Italian Campaign. Napoleon could reportedly not sit still for extended periods of time as a model for the portrait; Joséphine solved this by allowing Napoleon to sit in her lap and embracing him for the duration required by Gros. The painting was exhibited at the Salon of 1801.

The painting passed through the collections of Napoleon himself and of Napoleon III before being sequestered after the fall of the Second French Empire in 1870. It was then reacquired by Napoleon III's wife Eugénie de Montijo in 1871, who eight years later gave it to the Louvre (now inventory number RF271). It passed to the château de Compiègne in 1901, then finally the Palace of Versailles in 1938 (inventory number MV 6314).

== Related works ==
- Sketch at the Musée du Louvre, it was approved by Bonaparte as the basis for the final painting

Other versions at:

- Arenenberg, (Switzerland, canton of Thurgovie), Musée Napoléon.
- Saint Petersburg, Hermitage Museum
- The painting is sometimes used as a cover for Beethoven's 5 Piano Concerto in Es-Dur, Opus 73.

== See also ==
- The Crossing of the Arcole Bridge, an 1826 painting by Horace Vernet

== Bibliography ==
- (in French) Jean-Baptiste Delestre Gros et ses ouvrages éd. Jules Labitte 1845
- (in French) Raymond Escholier Gros ses amis et ses élèves - exhibition at the Petit Palais May–July 1936, éd. Floury Paris 1936 - pp. 1 à 4, plate 1 (Louvre sketch)
- (in French) David O Brien Antoine Jean Gros, peintre de Napoléon Gallimard 2006 - ISBN 2-07-011786-3 - chapter 1, une formation en Italie pp. 31–40
