= Antoine-Jean Gros =

French painter of historical subjects (1771–1835)

Antoine-Jean Gros, baron Gros
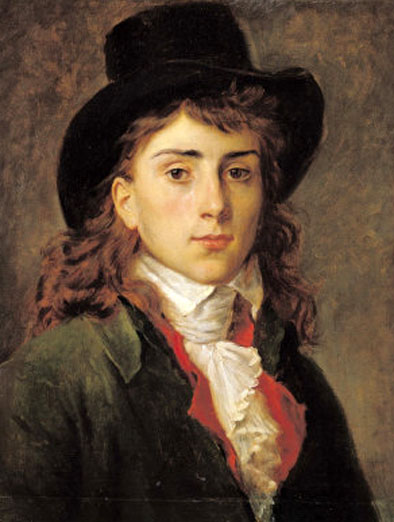
- Portrait by François Gérard, c. 1791
- Born: 16 March 1771; Paris, France
- Died: 25 June 1835 (aged 64) near Meudon, France
- Resting place: Père Lachaise Cemetery
- Education: Collège Mazarin
- Known for: History painting

Antoine-Jean Gros (French pronunciation: [ɑ̃twanʒɑ̃ gʁo]; 16 March 1771 – 25 June 1835) was a French painter of historical subjects. He was granted the title of Baron Gros in 1824.

Gros studied under Jacques-Louis David in Paris and began an independent artistic career during the French Revolution. Forced to leave France, Gros moved to Genoa. His portrait of French commander Napoleon Bonaparte at the Battle of Arcole in 1796 brought Gros to public attention and gained the patronage of Napoleon. After traveling with Napoleon's army for several years, he returned to Paris in 1799. In addition to producing several large paintings of battles and other events in Napoleon's life, Gros was a successful portraitist.

== Early life and training ==
Born in Paris, Gros began learning to draw at the age of six from his father, Jean-Antoine Gros, who was a miniature painter, and showed himself to be a gifted artist. His mother, Pierrette-Madeleine-Cécile Durand, was also a painter. Towards the close of 1785, Gros, by his own choice, entered the studio of Jacques-Louis David, which he frequented assiduously, continuing at the same time to follow the classes of the Collège Mazarin.

The death of his father, whose circumstances had been embarrassed by the French Revolution, threw Gros upon his own resources in 1791. He now devoted himself wholly to his profession, and he competed (unsuccessfully) in 1792 for the grand prix. Around this time, however, on the recommendation of the École des Beaux Arts, he painted portraits of the members of the National Convention, but as the Revolution developed, Gros left France in 1793 for Italy.

== Genoa and Bonaparte ==
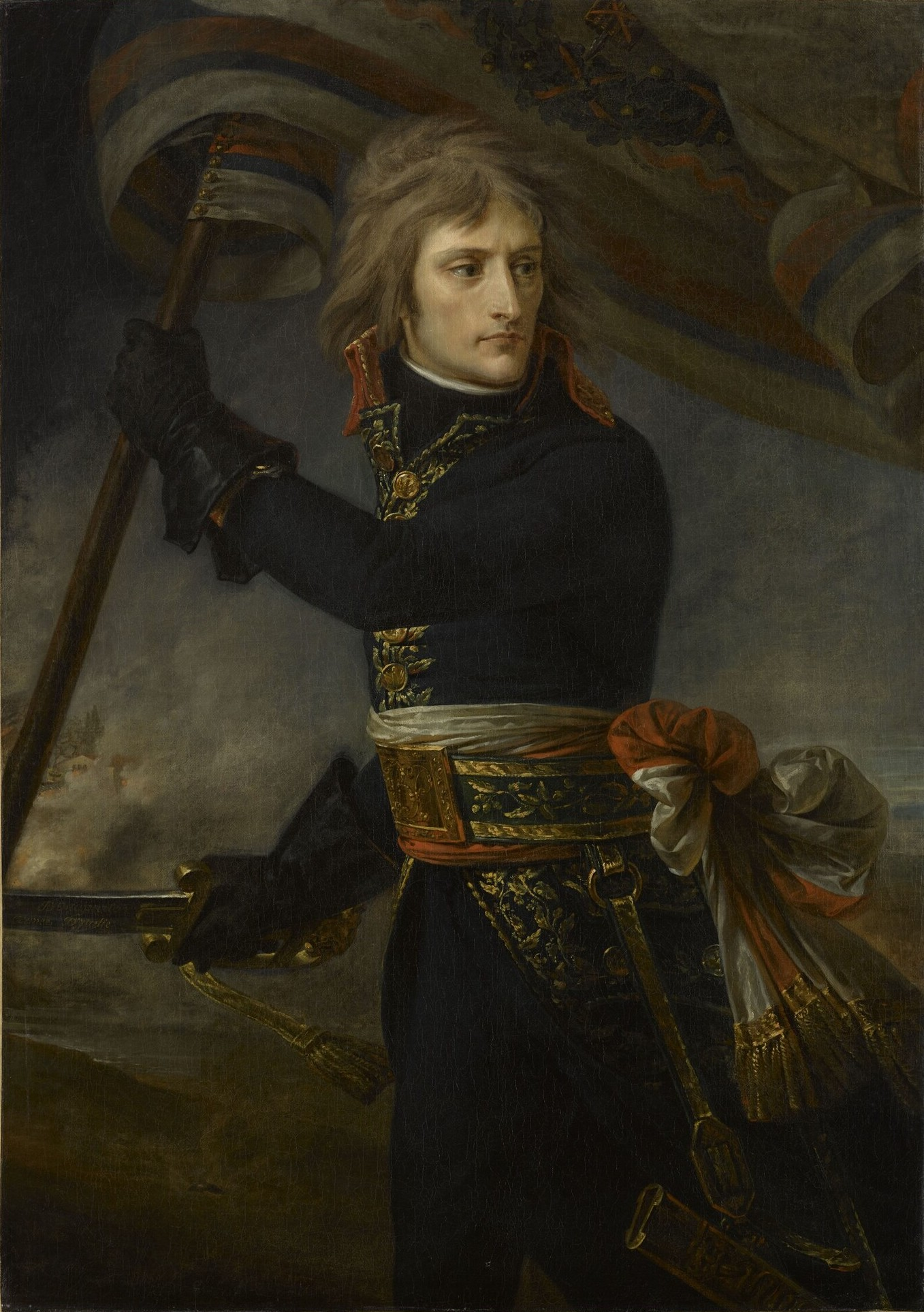
Bonaparte at the Pont d'Arcole (1796), Palace of Versailles

Gros supported himself in Genoa as a portraitist. He visited Florence and returned to Genoa, where he met Joséphine de Beauharnais. Following her to Milan, Gros was well received by her husband, Napoleon Bonaparte.

After Gros painted the scene Bonaparte at the Pont d'Arcole, Bonaparte gave him the post of inspecteur aux revues, which allowed Gros to follow the army. In 1797, Gros was charged with selecting the spoils for the Louvre.

== Paris ==
In 1799, Gros left Genoa and made his way to Paris. In the beginning of 1801, he took up his quarters in the Capucins. His study for the painting of the Battle of Nazareth, now in the Musée d'Arts de Nantes, gained the prize offered in 1802 by the consuls, but the project was not carried out, owing, it is said, to Napoleon's jealousy of Jean-Andoche Junot, the general in the painting. Gros was commissioned to paint Bonaparte Visiting the Plague Victims of Jaffa, which is now in the Louvre. This was followed in 1806 by Gros's Bataille d’Aboukir, 25 Juillet 1799 (Joachim Murat at the Battle of Abukir) now at Versailles; and in 1808 by his Napoléon sur le champ de bataille d'Eylau, le 9 février 1807 (Napoleon at the battlefield after the Battle of Eylau) now in the Louvre.

== Salon of 1804 and later life ==
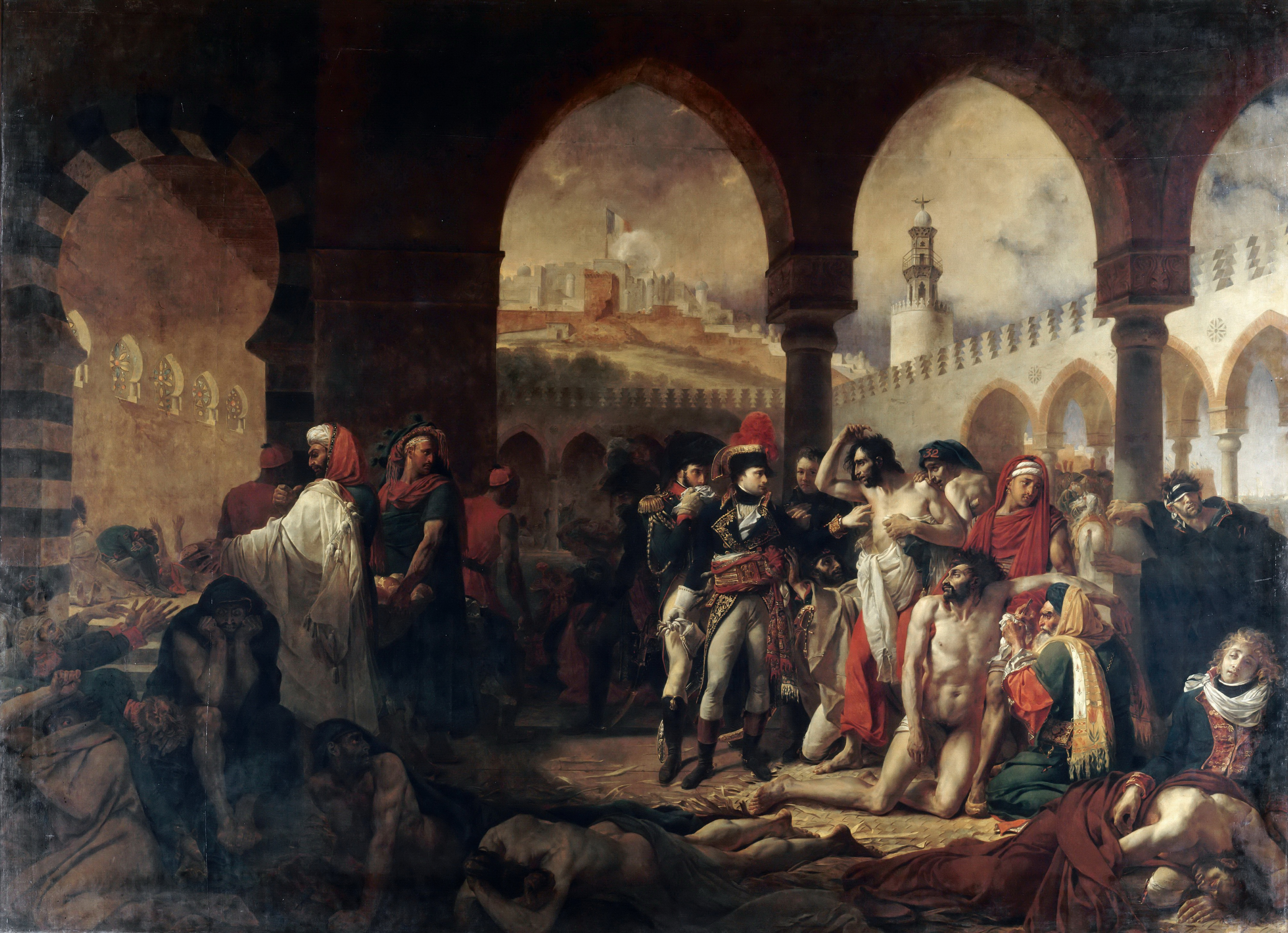
Bonaparte Visiting the Plague Victims of Jaffa (1804)

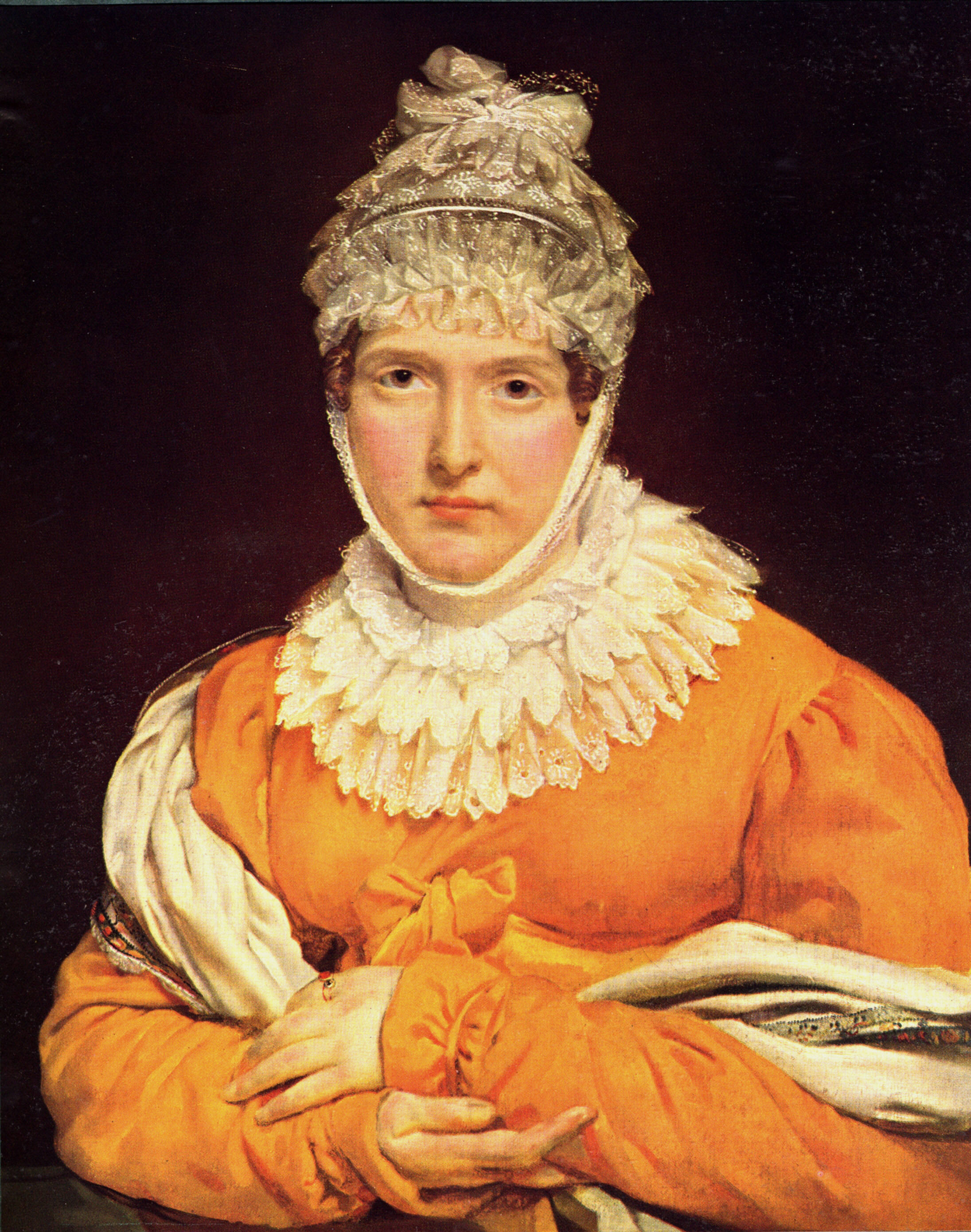
Portrait of Madame Récamier (1825)

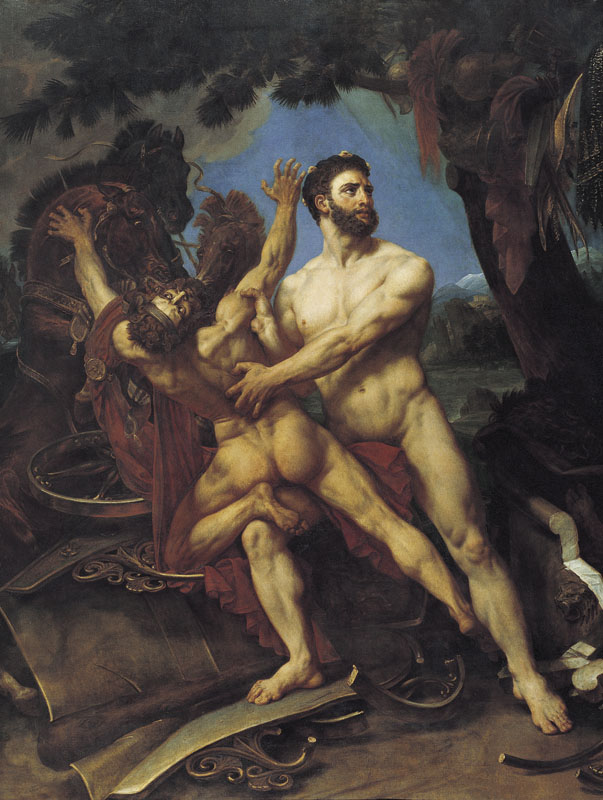
Hercules and Diomedes (1835)

At the Salon of 1804, Gros debuted his painting Bonaparte Visiting the Plague Victims of Jaffa. The painting launched his career as a successful painter. It depicts Bonaparte in Jaffa visiting soldiers infected with the bubonic plague. He is portrayed reaching out to one of the sick, unfazed by the illness. According to P. Jill Morse, Napoleon commissioned Gros to paint the scene to neutralize British propaganda. The propaganda focused on two episodes of Napoleon's Egyptian campaign (1798–1800). First when he ordered the massacre of Turkish prisoners. Second, when he ordered the death by poison of French soldiers suffering from the plague. The painting showed a compassionate Napoleon visiting the sick at the plague hospital. Morse adds that Gros was probably using the disease as a metaphor for the vanity of Napoleon and his First Empire.

While Bonaparte did actually visit the pest house, later, as his army prepared to withdraw from Syria, he ordered the poisoning (with laudanum) of about fifty of his plague-infected men.

In 1810, his Madrid and Napoleon at the Pyramids (Versailles) show that Napoleon had deserted him. His Francis I and Charles V, 1812 (Louvre), had considerable success.

In 1835, alienated by the rising tide of Romanticism and after the failure of his Hercules and Diomedes at the Salon of 1835, Gros committed suicide by drowning.

== Friendship with Élisabeth Vigée Le Brun ==
Élisabeth Vigée Le Brun formed an intimate friendship, Le Brun had known him since he was seven years old and had painted his portrait when he was at that age, during which she had noticed an artistic inclination in the child. Upon her return to France she was surprised to find Gros had become a successful and famous painter, head of his own school of art. Gros was socially reclusive, and often brusque to others, but he formed a close bond with Vigée Le Brun, who wrote:

"Gros was always a man of natural impulses. He was prone to feel the keenest sensations and would become equally passionate over a kind action or a beautiful work of art. He was ill at ease in society, rarely breaking the silence in a crowded place, but he listened attentively and replied with his gentle smile, or by a single word, always very apt. To appreciate Gros, one had to know him intimately. Then he would open up his heart, a kind and noble one at that; some people reproached him for having a certain brusqueness of tone, but this disappeared entirely in private. His conversation was even more fascinating because he never expressed himself in the same way as other men; always finding the most unusual and powerful images to convey a thought, you might almost say he painted with words."

She was greatly affected by his suicide in 1835; she had met him the day before and noted him brooding over criticism he had received over one of his paintings Hercules and Diomedes.

== Fame ==
Gros was made a member of the Legion of Honour on 22 October 1808 by Napoleon, after the Salon of 1808, where he had exhibited the Battle of Eylau. Gros had many pupils and gained considerably more after David left Paris in 1815.

Under the Bourbon Restoration, Gros became a member of the Académie des Beaux-Arts, a professor at the École des Beaux-Arts, and a member of the Order of Saint Michael. He was granted the title of baron in 1824 by King Charles X of France.

Gros inspired Eugène Delacroix, especially with his work in lithography. The two both worked during the same time period, and both did portraits of Napoleon. However, at one point, Gros had referred to Delacroix's Chios and Missolonghi as "a massacre of art".

G. Dargenty produced a book on the subject entitled Les Artistes célèbres. Le Bon Gros (1887).

M. Delcluze gave a brief notice of his life in Louis David et son temps ("Louis David and his times"), and Julius Meyer's Geschichte der modernen französischen Malerei ("History of Modern French Painting") contains what Britannica cites as an excellent criticism on his works.

== Iconography ==
Image	Title	Date	Dimensions	Collection
	Autoportrait	1795		Palace of Versailles
	Madame Pasteur	1795–1796		The Louvre
	Portrait of Madame Bruyere	1796	79 × 65 cm	Bristol City Museum and Art Gallery
	Bonaparte at the Pont d'Arcole	1796	130 × 94 cm	Palace of Versailles
	Portrait of the Maistre Sisters	1796	43.2 x 31.2	Art Institute of Chicago
	The Death of Timophanes	1798	44.4 × 57.6 cm	The Louvre
	Portrait of Christine Boyer	c. 1800	214 × 134 cm	The Louvre
	The Battle of Nazareth	1801	136.1 x 196.4 cm	Musée des Beaux-Arts de Nantes
	Sappho at Leucate	1801	122 × 100 cm	Musée Baron Gérard, Bayeux
	Bonaparte, First Consul	1802	205 × 127 cm	Musée de la Légion d'honneur
	Bonaparte Visiting the Plague Victims of Jaffa	1804	715 × 523 cm	The Louvre
	Gérard-Christophe-Michel Duroc, duc de Frioul (1772–1813)	1805	218 × 142 cm	Palace of Versailles
	Battle of Aboukir, 25 July 1799	1806	578 × 968 cm	Palace of Versailles
	Battle of Eylau, 9 February 1807	1807	104.9 × 145.1 cm	The Louvre
	General Lasalle at the Siege of Stettin	1808	248 x 174 cm	Army Museum
	Impératrice Joséphine	1808		Musée des Beaux-Arts de Nice
	Portrait of the French composer Pierre Zimmermann	1808	118.5 × 91 cm	Palace of Versailles
	Equestrian portrait of Jérôme Bonaparte	c. 1808	321 × 265 cm	Palace of Versailles
	Equestrian portrait of Prince Boris Yusupov	1809	321 × 266 cm	Pushkin Museum
	The Battle of the Pyramids	1810	389 × 311 cm	Palace of Versailles
	Napoleon accepts the surrender of Madrid, 4 December 1808	1810	361 × 500 cm	Musée de l'Histoire de France (Versailles)
	The Horse of Mustapha Pasha	c. 1810	89 × 175 cm	Musée des Beaux-Arts et d'archéologie de Besançon
	Portrait of General Claude Legrand	c. 1810	245 × 172 cm	Palace of Versailles
	Portrait of Second Lieutenant Charles Legrand	c. 1810	249 × 162 cm	Los Angeles County Museum of Art
	The Apotheosis of Saint Genevieve	1811–1824		Panthéon de Paris
	François I and Charles V Visiting the Church of Saint-Denis	1812		The Louvre
	Interview Between Napoleon and Francis II after the Battle of Austerlitz	1812		Palace of Versailles
	Equestrian portrait of Joachim Murat	1812	89 × 175 cm	Musée des Beaux-Arts et d'archéologie de Besançon
	General Baston de Lariboisière and his son Ferdinand	c. 1815		Musée de l'Armée
	Honoré-Charles Baston de Lariboisière	1815	73 × 59 cm	Private collection
	Portrait of the Duchess of Angoulême	1816	257 x 182 cm	Palace of Versailles
	The Departure of Louis XVIII from the Tuileries Palace	1817	405 × 525 cm	Palace of Versailles
	The Embarkation of the Duchess of Angoulême at Pauillac	1818	326 × 504 cm	Musée des Beaux-Arts de Bordeaux
	Bacchus and Ariadne	1820	86 × 100.3 cm	Phoenix Art Museum
	Portrait of Jean-Antoine Chaptal	1824		Musée des Beaux-Arts de Bordeaux
	Portrait of Madame Récamier	1825	62.3 × 51.2 cm	Strossmayer Gallery of Old Masters
	The Genius of France Giving Life to the Arts and Protecting Humanity	c. 1827		The Louvre
	Hercules and Diomedes	1835	426 × 324 cm	Musée des Augustins
	Portrait of Pierre Daru	19th century	216 × 142 cm	Palace of Versailles

== See also ==
- Félix Louis Leullier
- Napoleon legacy and memory
