= Salon of 1801 =

1801 art exhibition in Paris

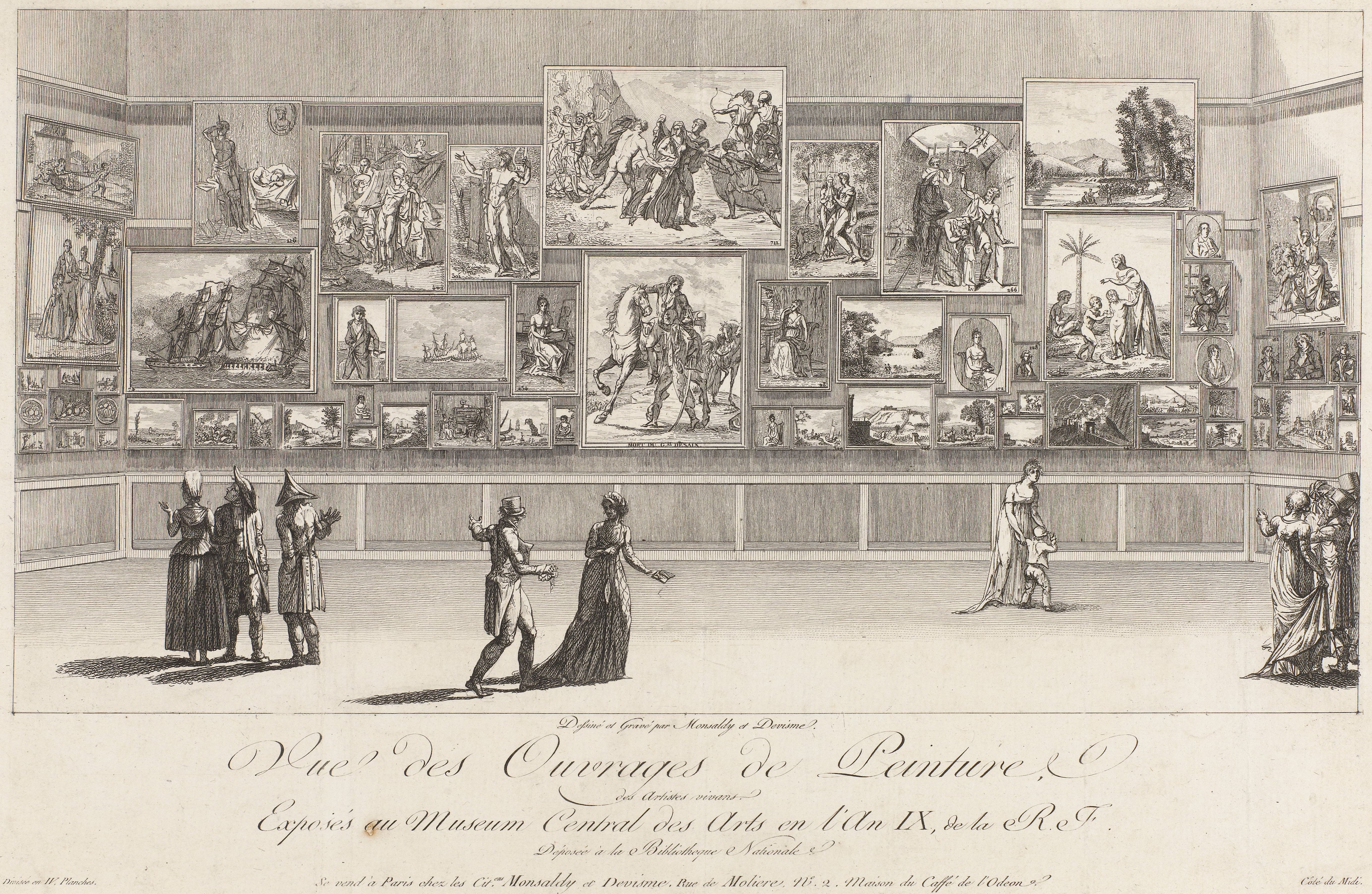
View of the Salon of 1801, engraving by Antoine Maxime Monsaldy and G. Devisme

The Salon of 1801 was an art exhibition held at the Louvre in Paris held between 18 September and 31 October 1801. It took place during the French Consulate with General Napoleon Bonaparte the dominant force in French society. This was reflected in several of the paintings displayed. Notably Bonaparte at the Pont d'Arcole by Antoine-Jean Gros depicts a scene from the Italian Campaign. Louis-François Lejeune's The Battle of Marengo depicts a major victory from the same campaign.

Napoleon's wife featured in the Portrait of Josephine Bonaparte by François Gérard. Other paintings on display were the history painting Brutus Condemning His Sons to Death by Guillaume Guillon-Lethière and Portrait of Pierre-Narcisse Guérin by Robert Lefèvre. The sculptor Claude Ramey submitted the marble statuette Sappho.

Stylistically Neoclassicism remained in the ascendency. Jacques-Louis David, one of the leading figures in the French art world, did not exhibit any paintings this year.

== Gallery ==
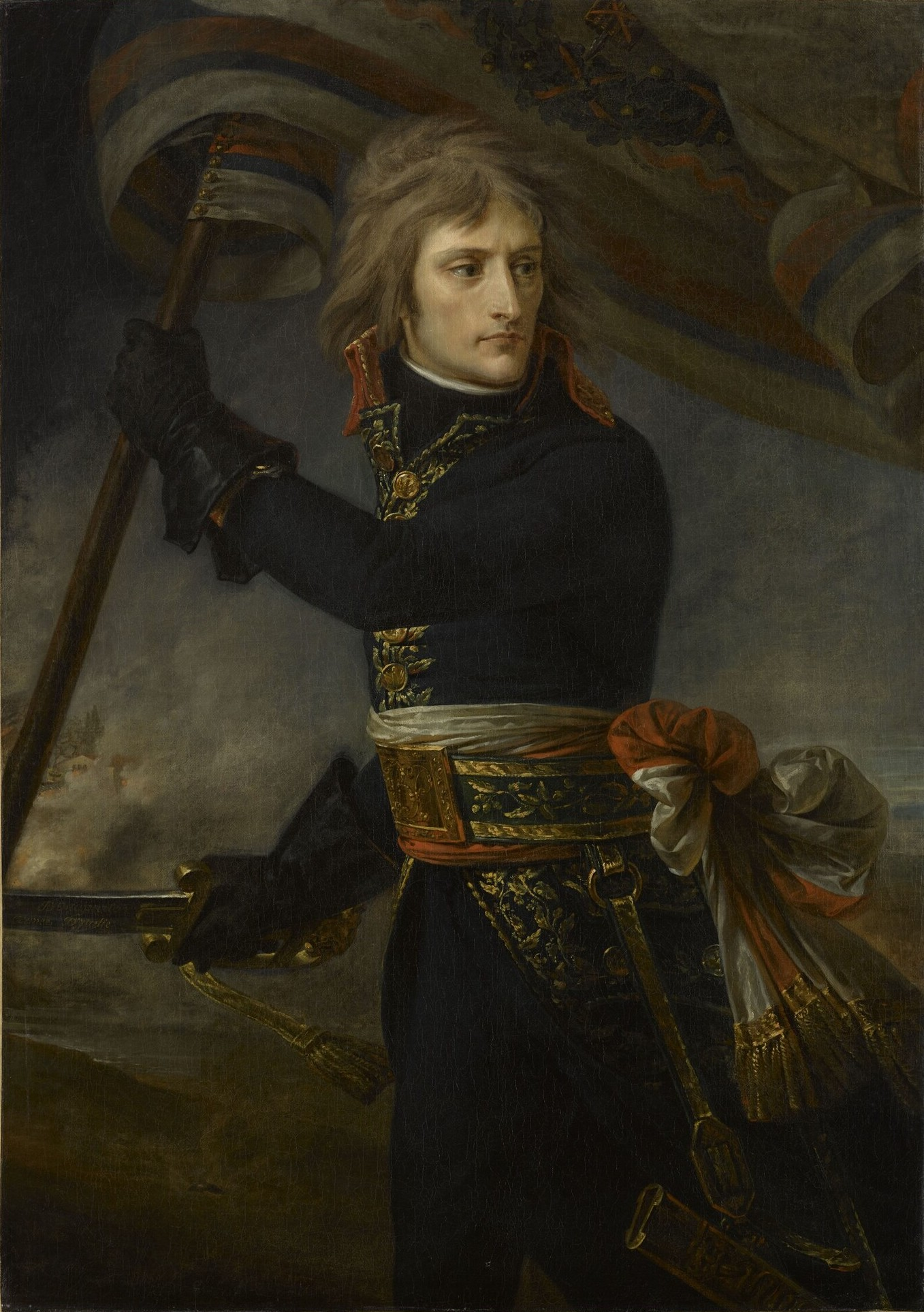
Bonaparte at the Pont d'Arcole by Antoine-Jean Gros

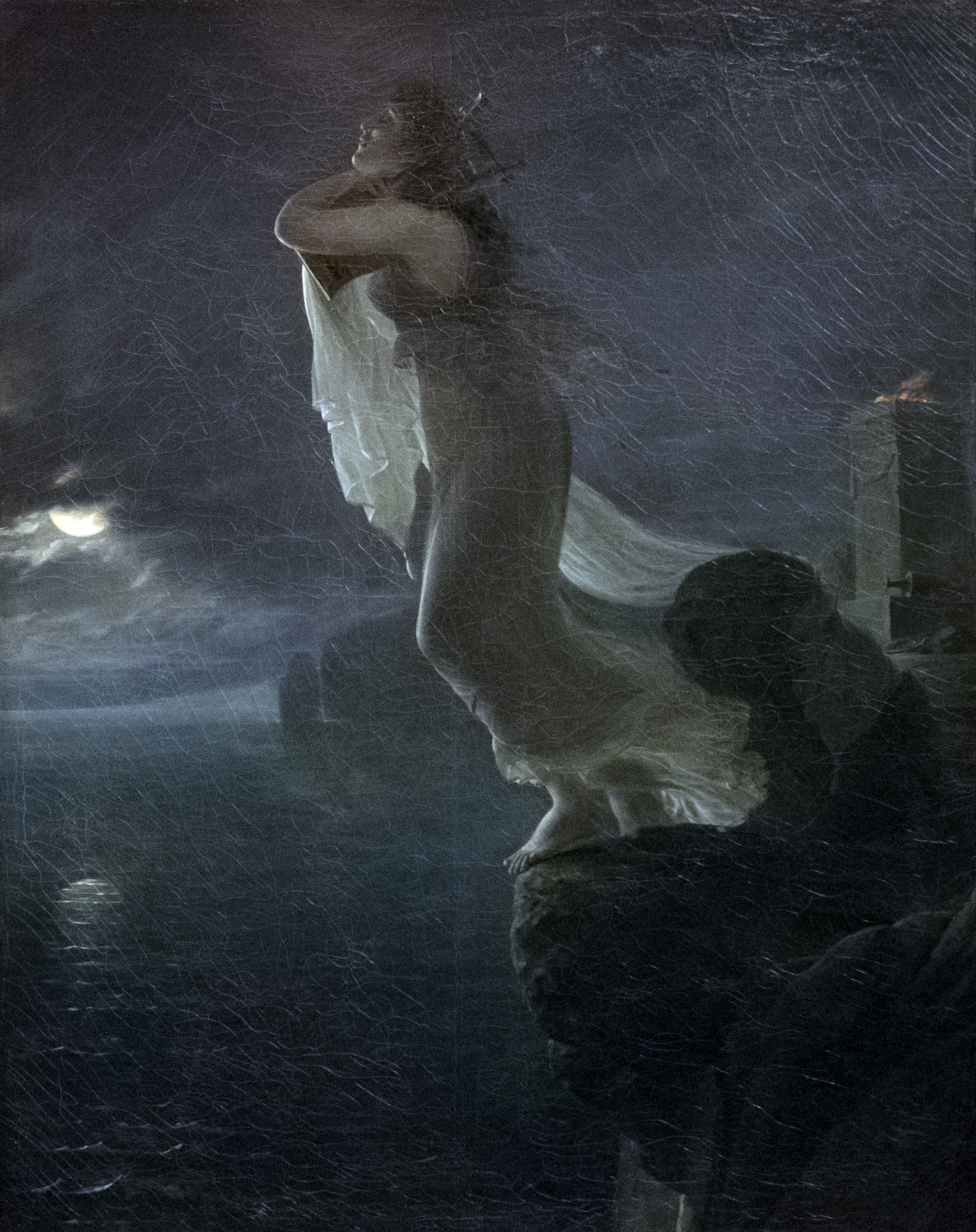
Sappho at Leucate by Antoine-Jean Gros

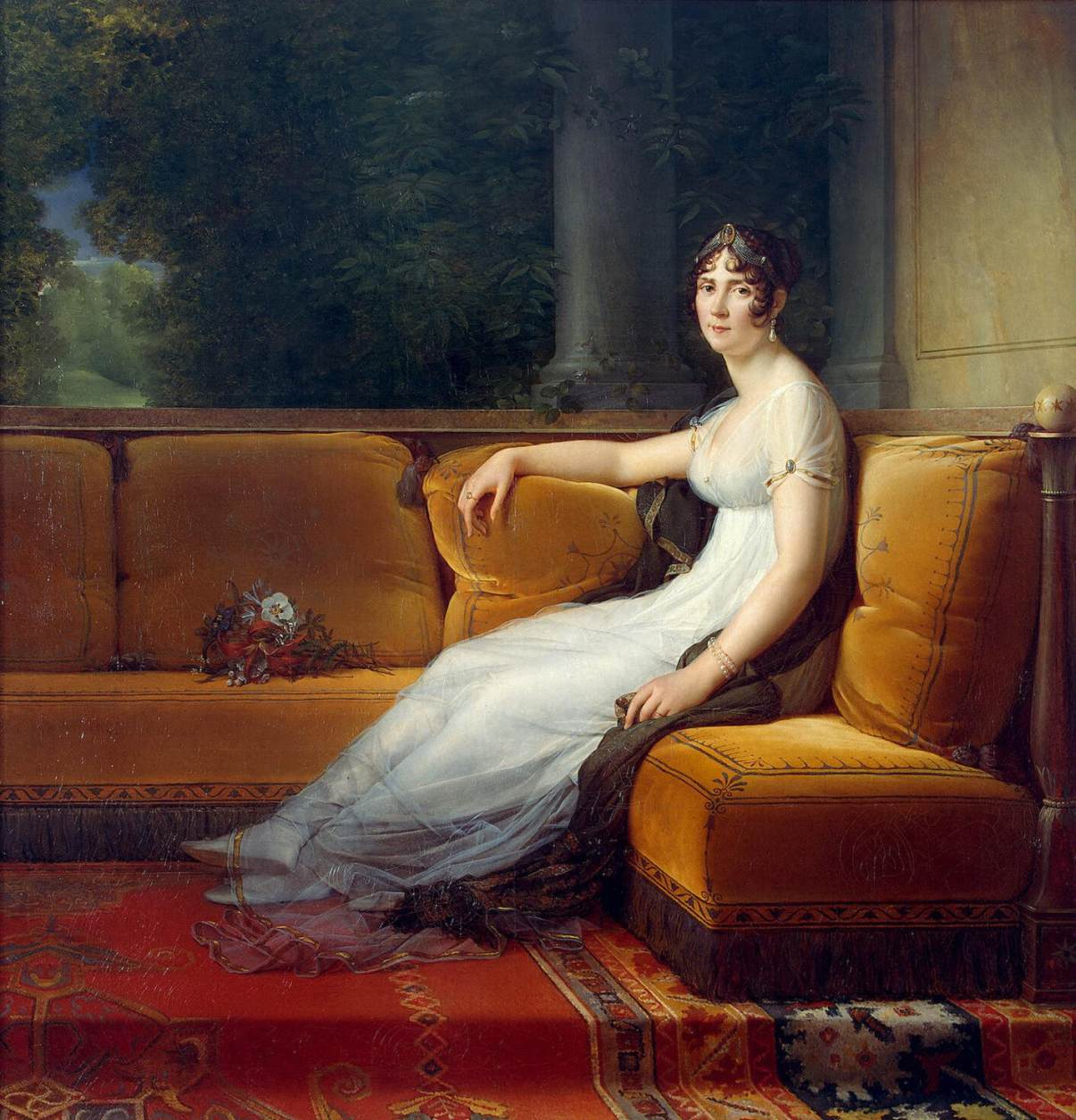
Portrait of Josephine Bonaparte by François Gérard

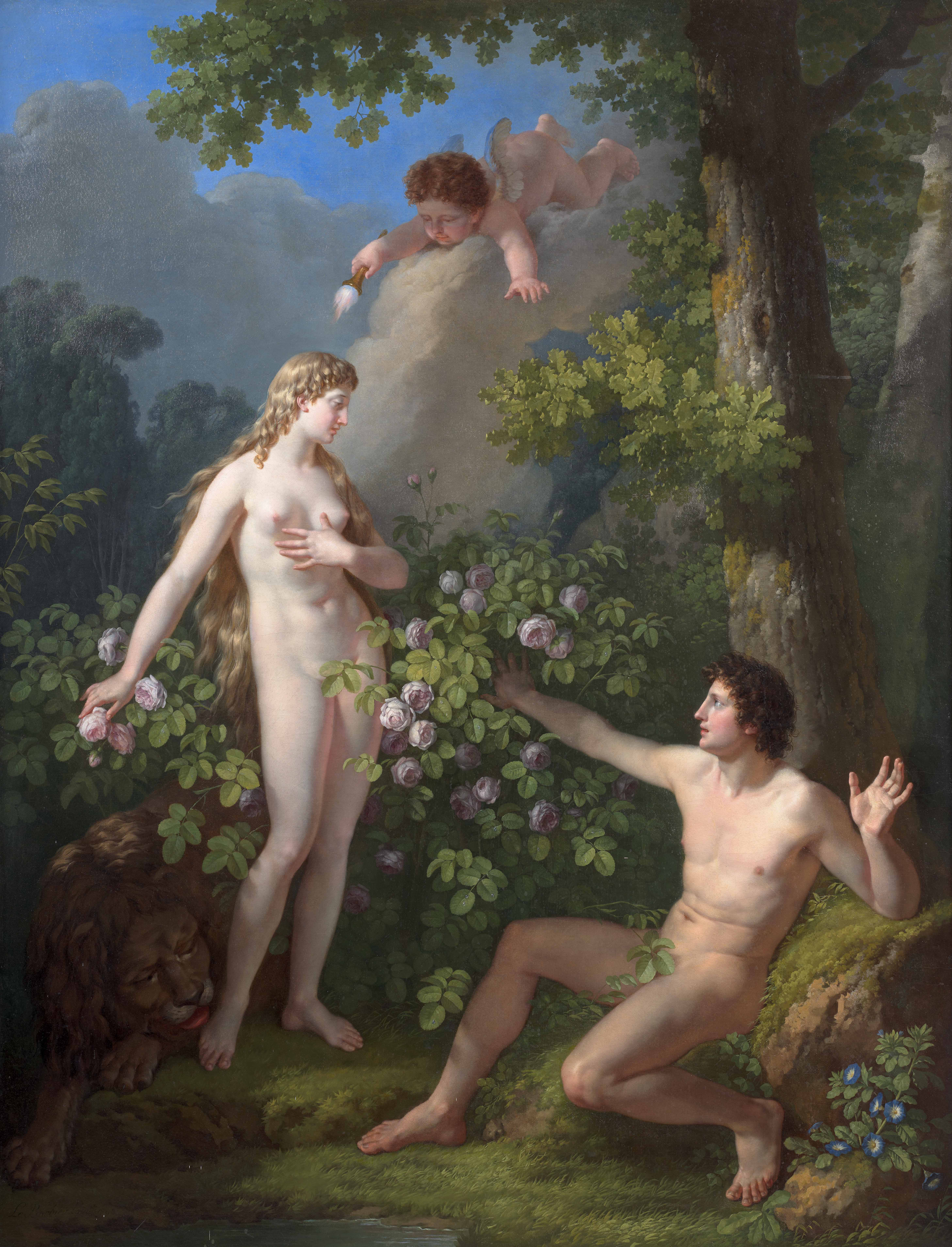
The First Man and the First Woman by Jean-Jacques Le Barbier

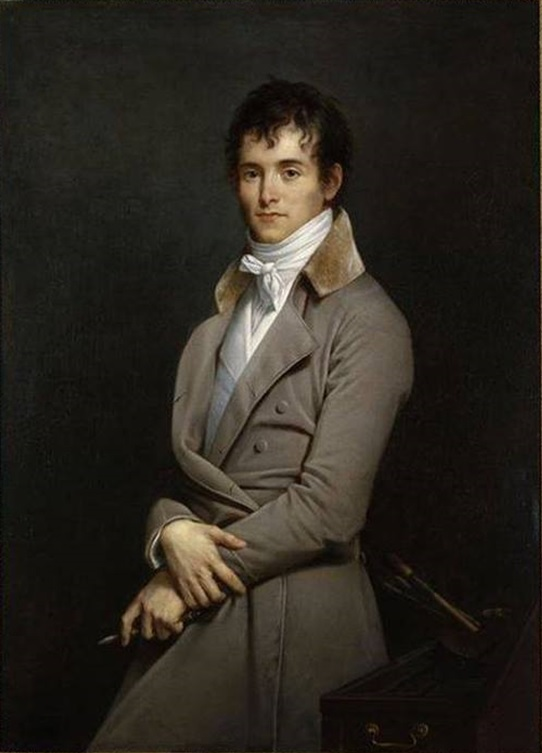
Portrait of Pierre-Narcisse Guérin by Robert Lefèvre

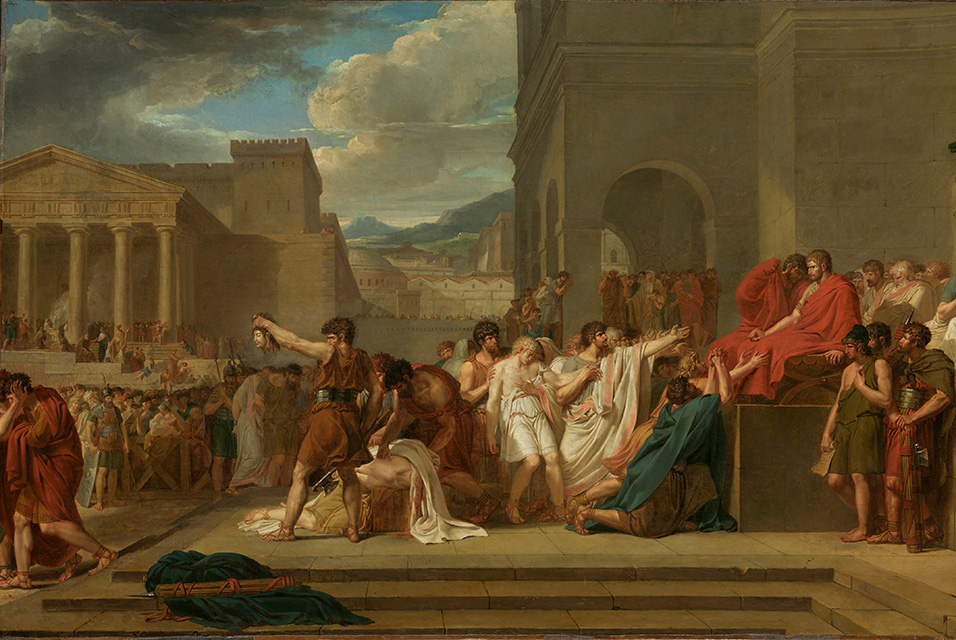
Brutus Condemning His Sons to Death by Guillaume Guillon-Lethière

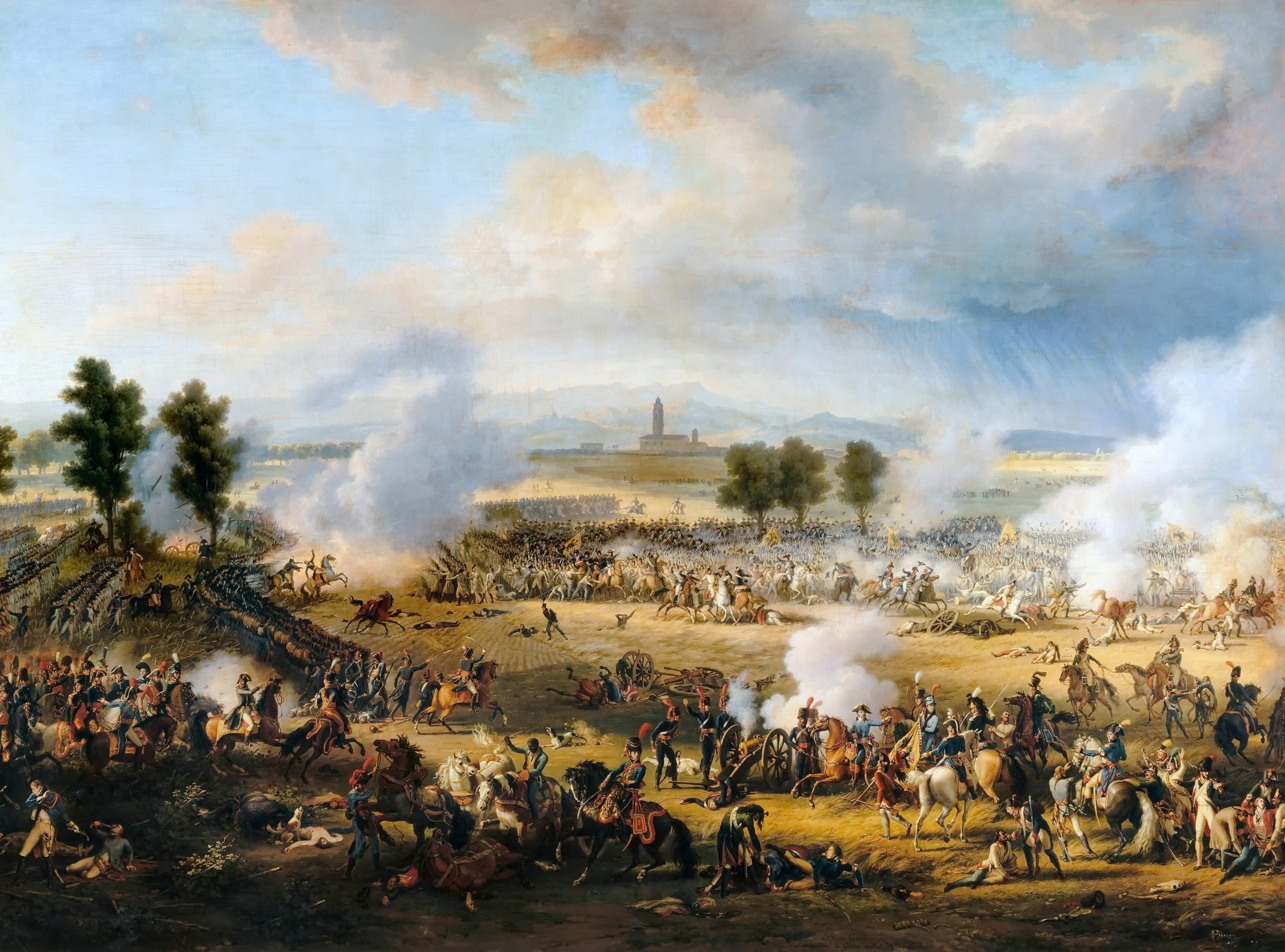
The Battle of Marengo by Louis-François Lejeune

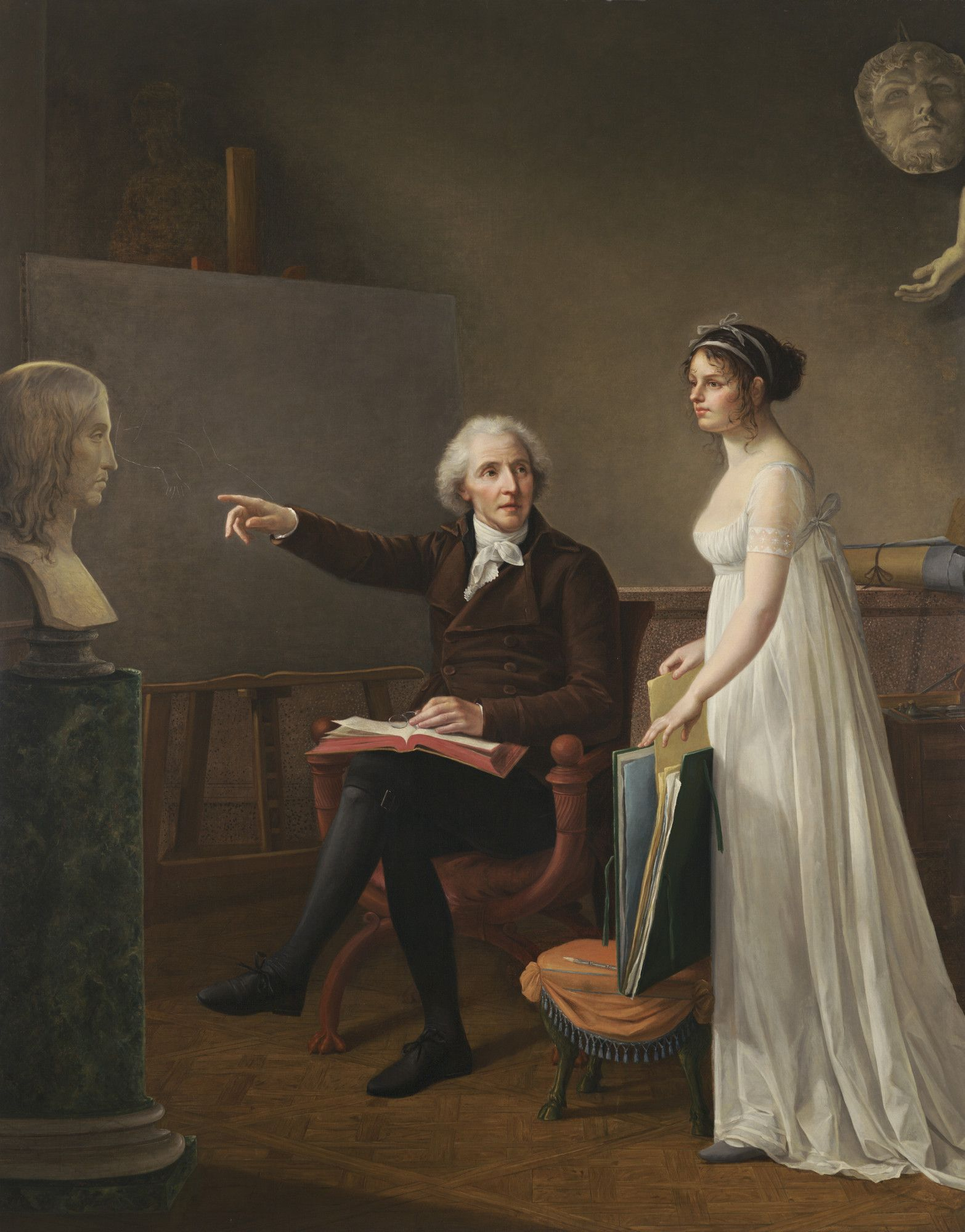
Self-Portrait of the Artist with her Father by Constance Mayer

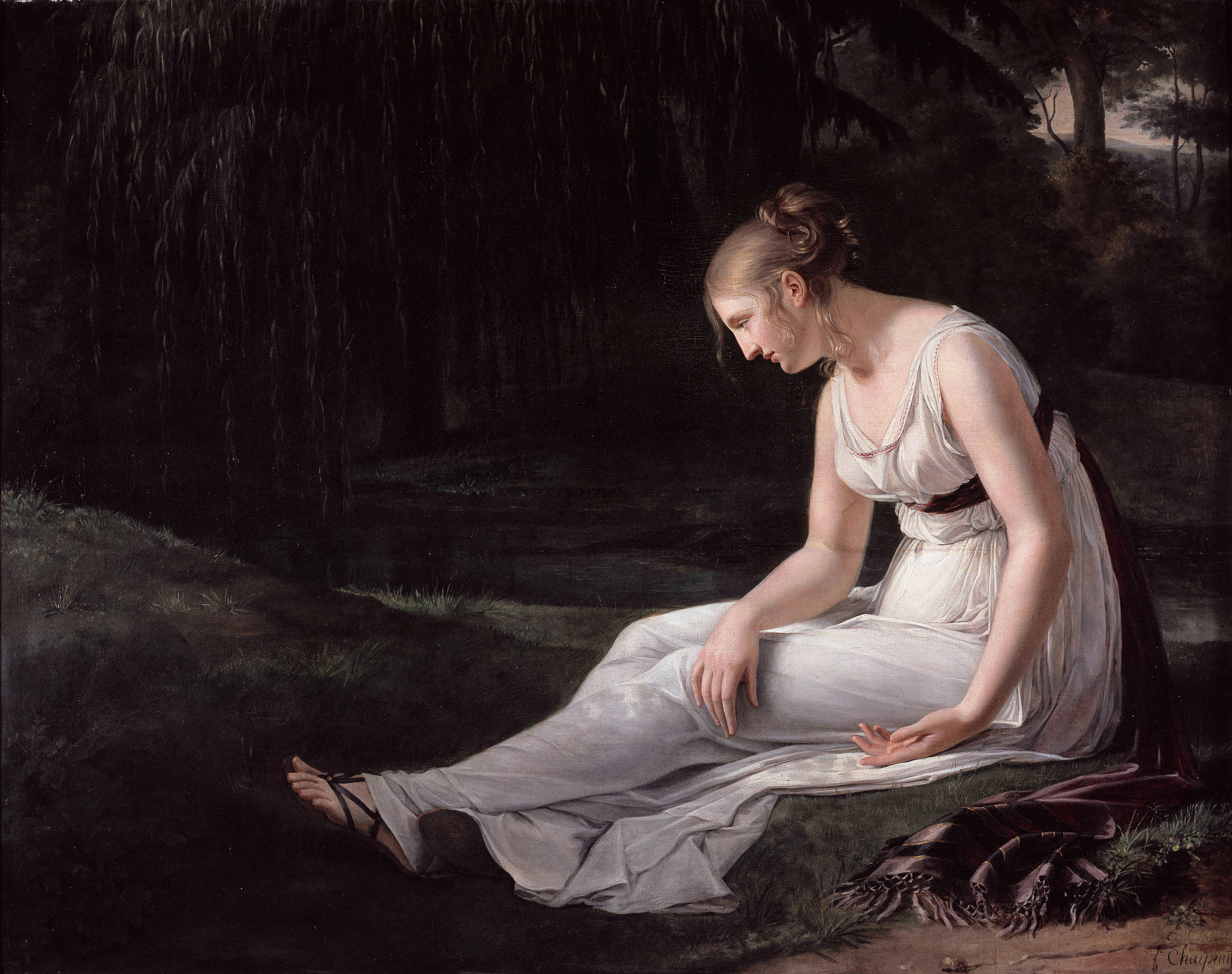
Melancholy by Constance Marie Charpentier

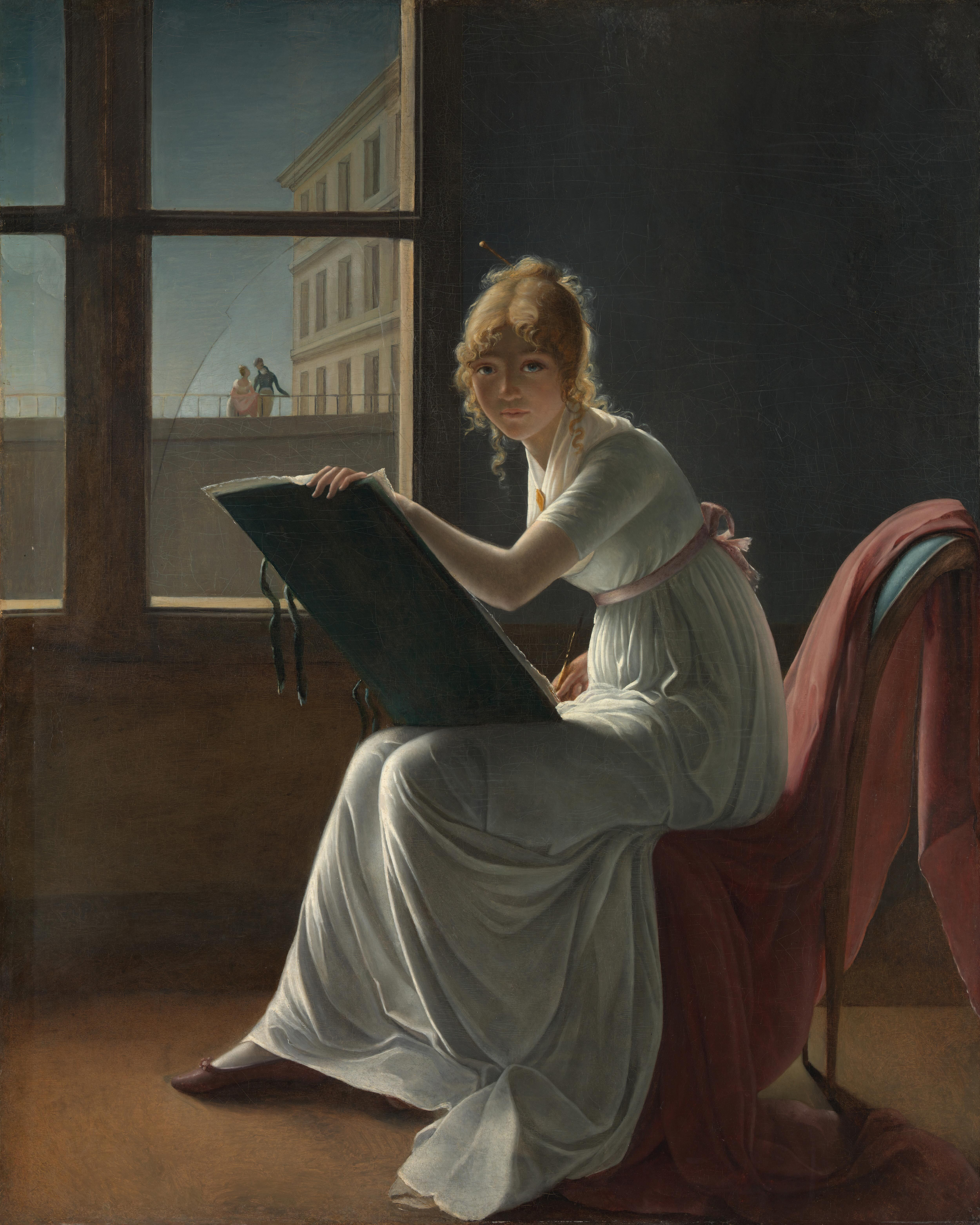
Portrait of Charlotte du Val d'Ognes by Marie-Denise Villers

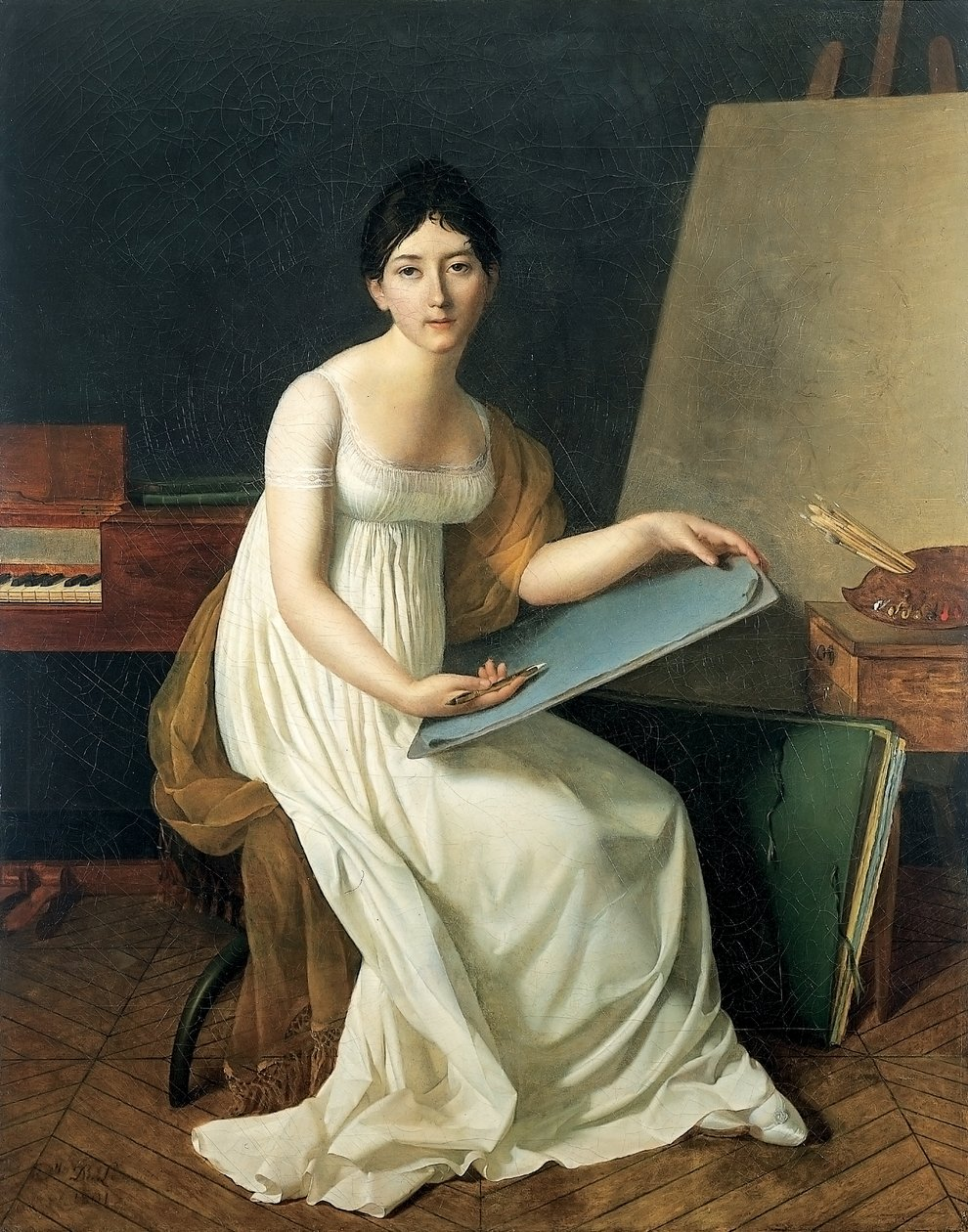
Self-Portrait by Henriette Lorimier

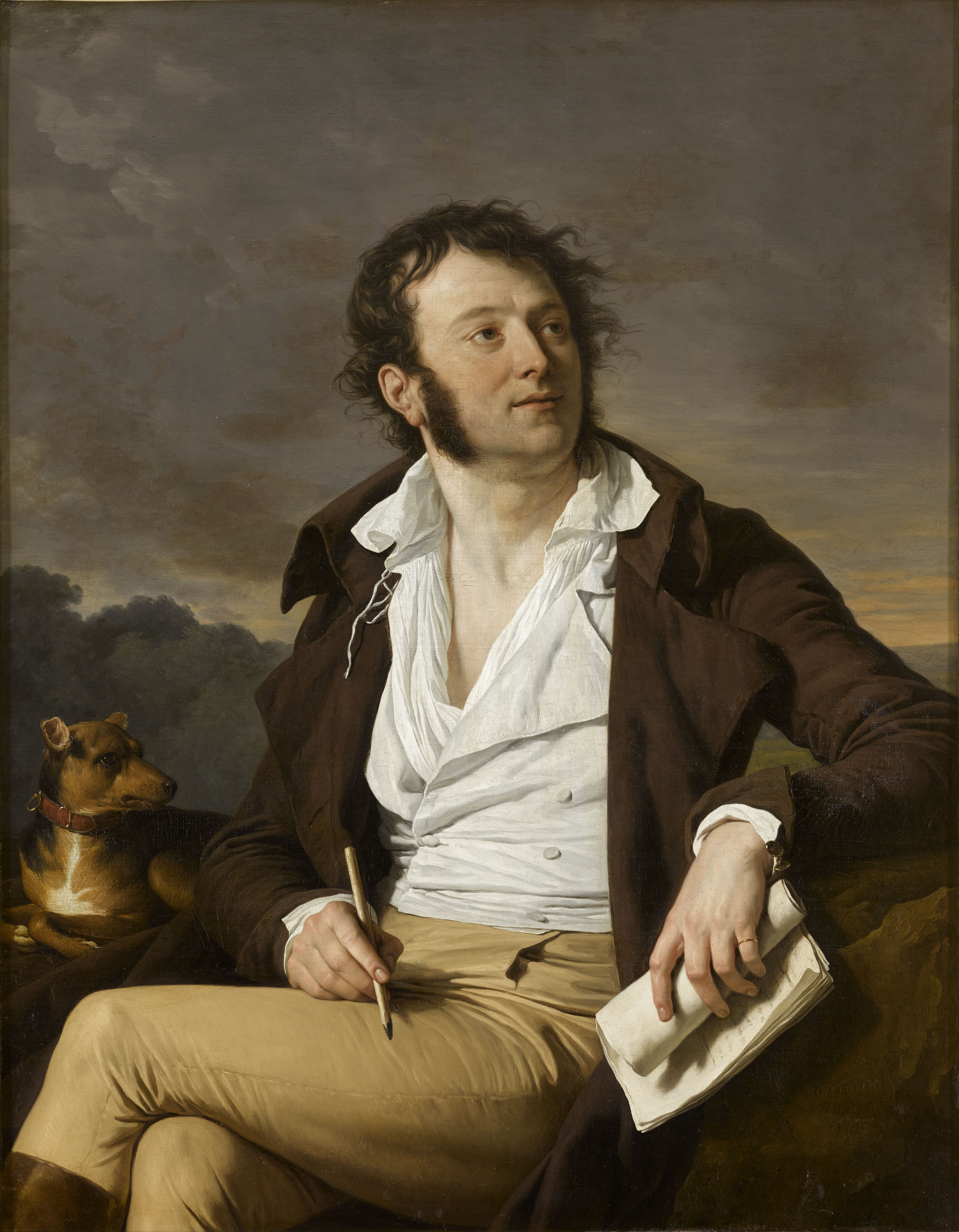
Portrait of Antoine-Vincent Arnault by François-André Vincent

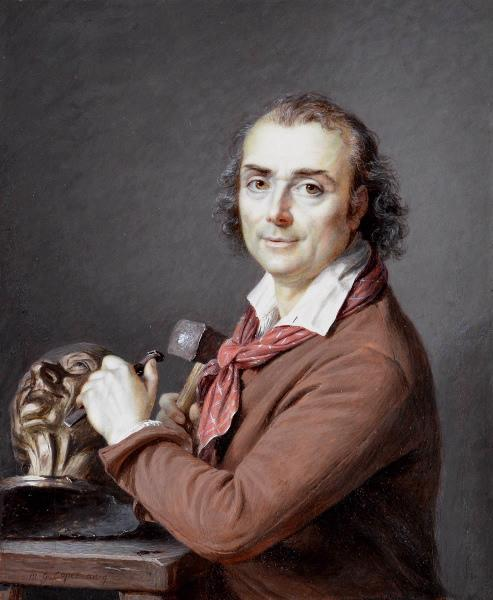
Houdon Working on a Bust of Voltaire by Marie-Gabrielle Capet

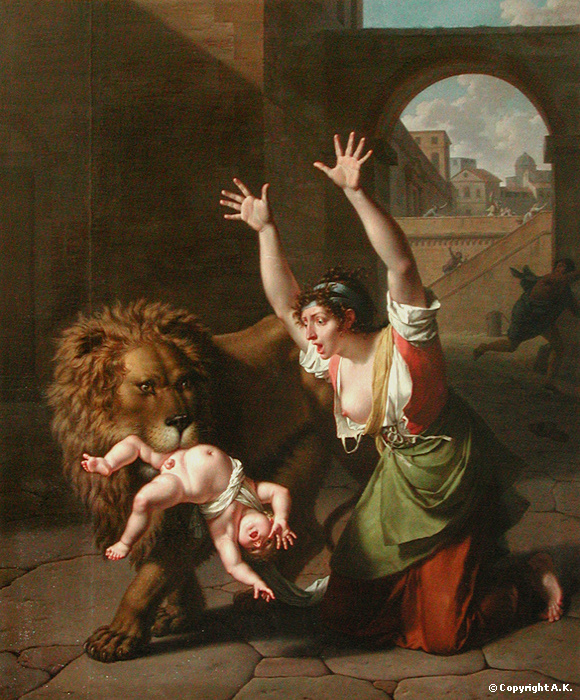
The Lion of Florence by Nicolas-André Monsiau

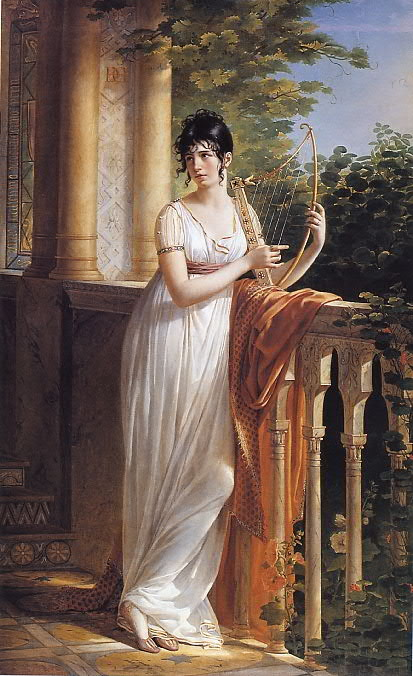
Portrait of Madame d'Arjuzon by René Théodore Berthon

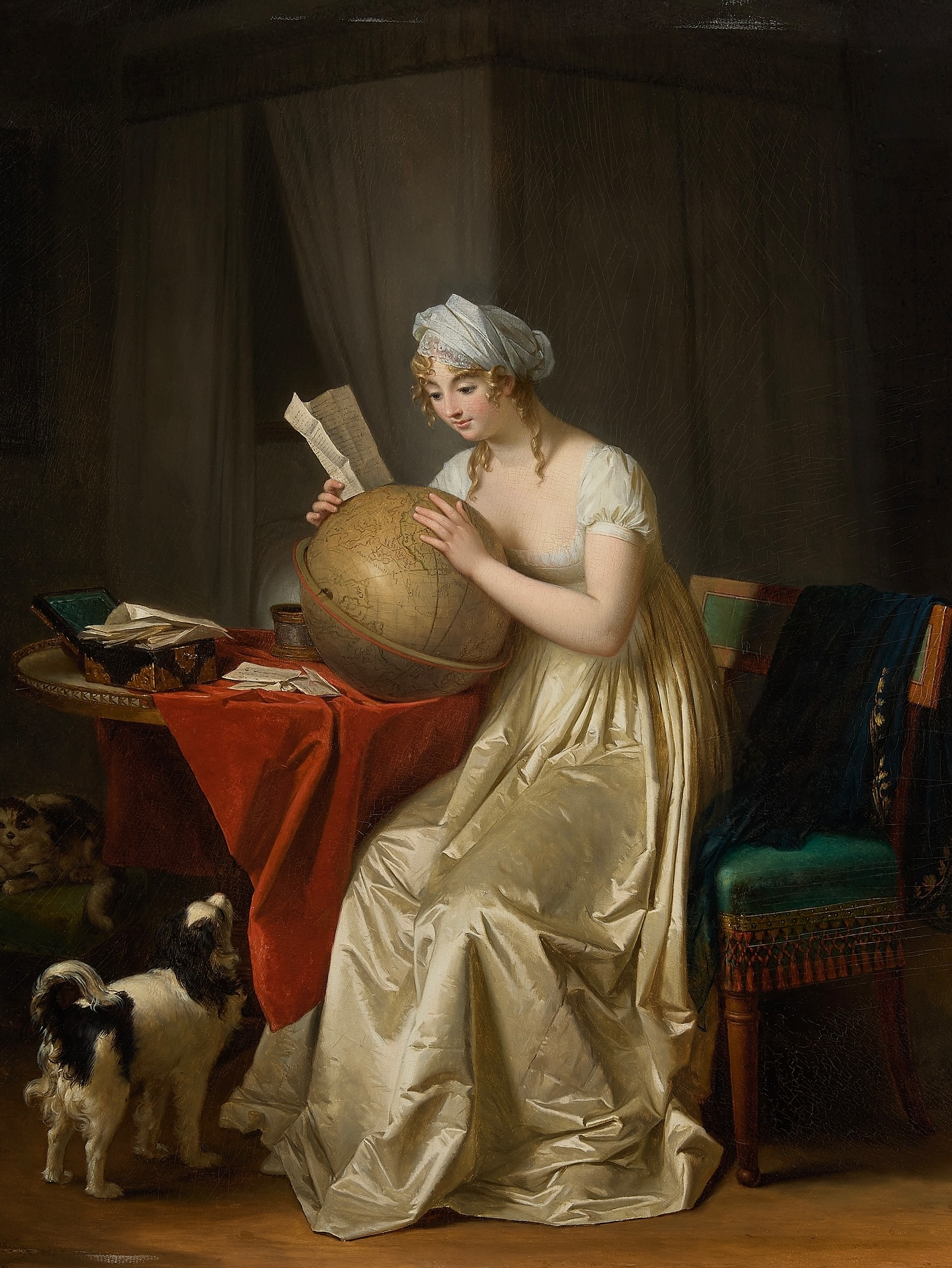
A Young Woman Consulting a Globe by Marguerite Gérard

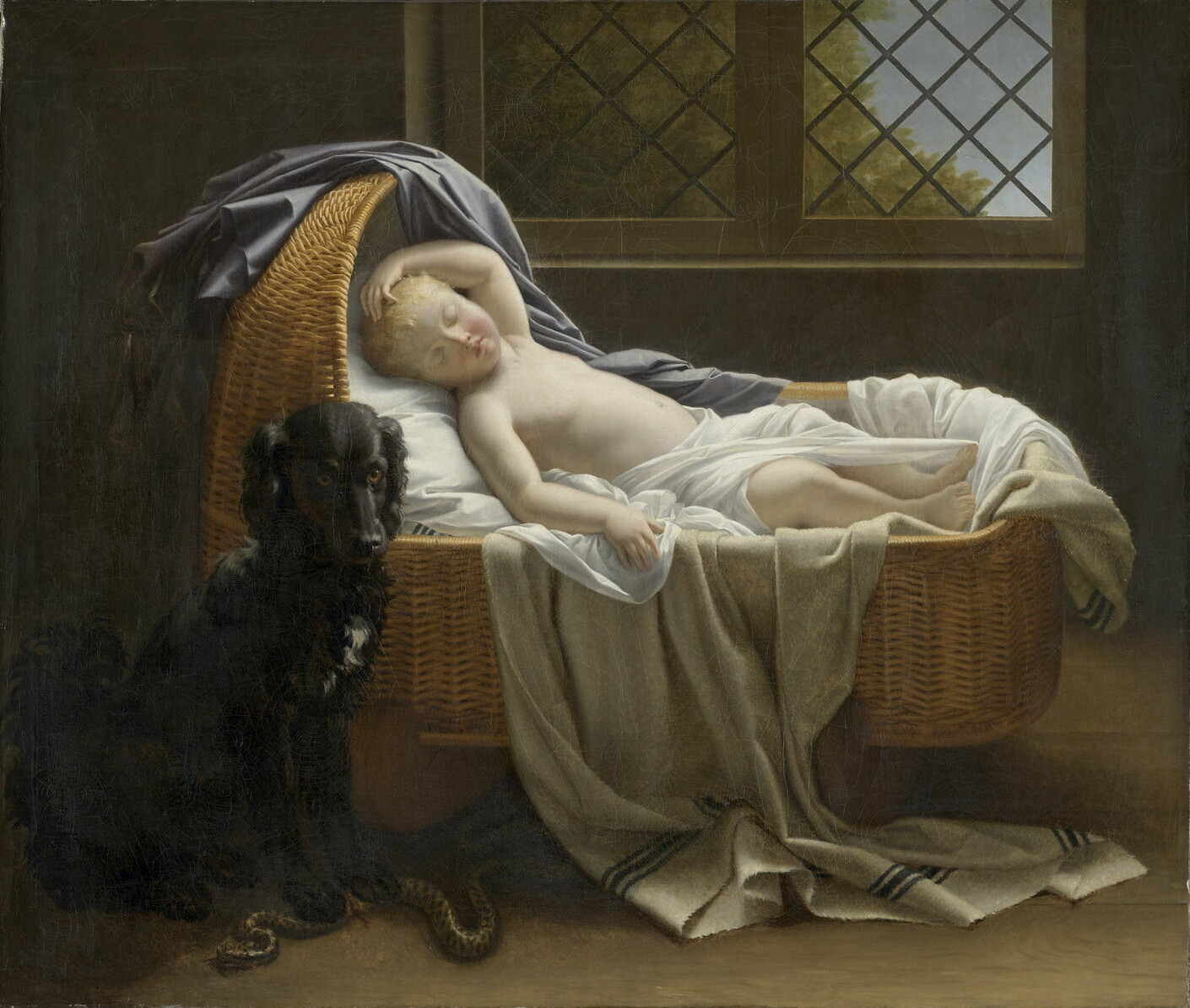
The Sleeping Child in the Care of a Brave Dog by Jeanne-Elisabeth Chaudet

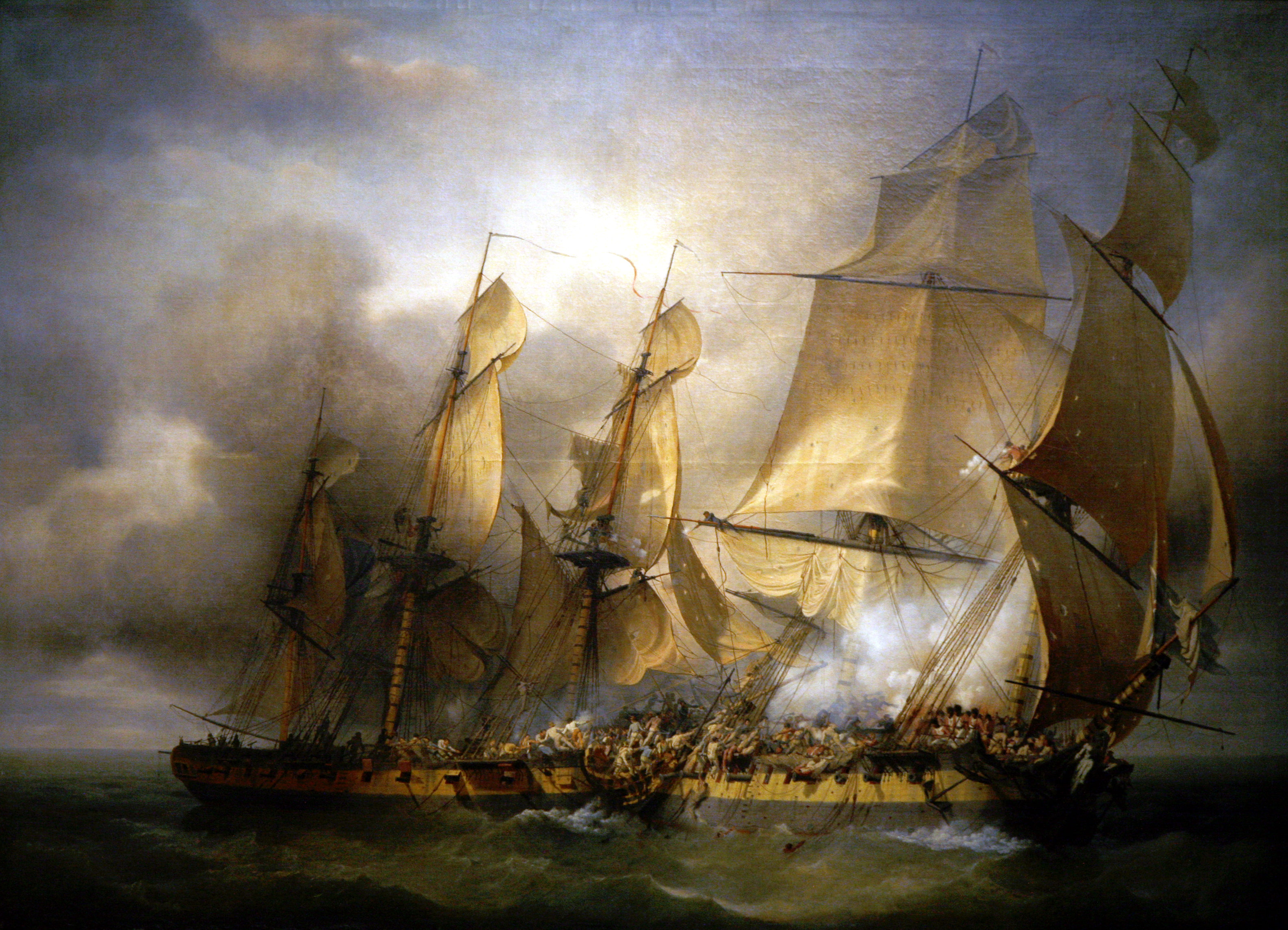
Combat Between the Bayonnaise and the Ambuscade by Louis-Philippe Crépin

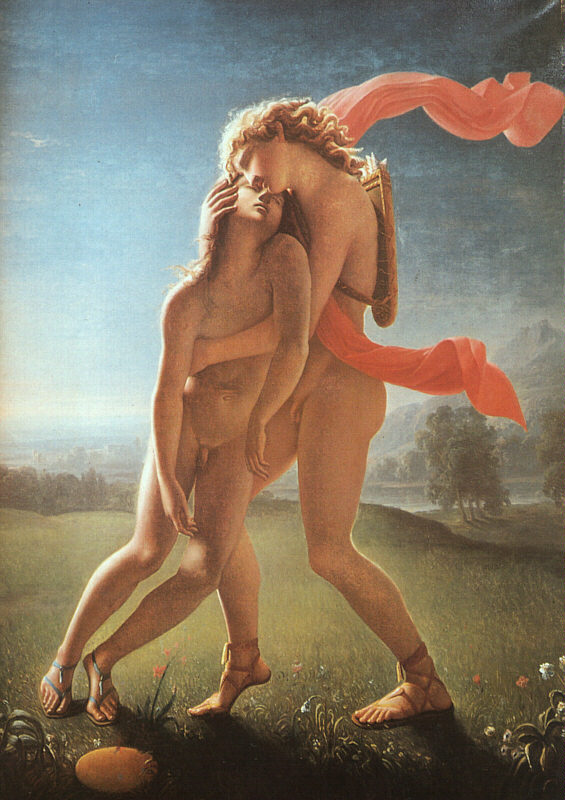
The Death of Hyacinthos by Jean Broc

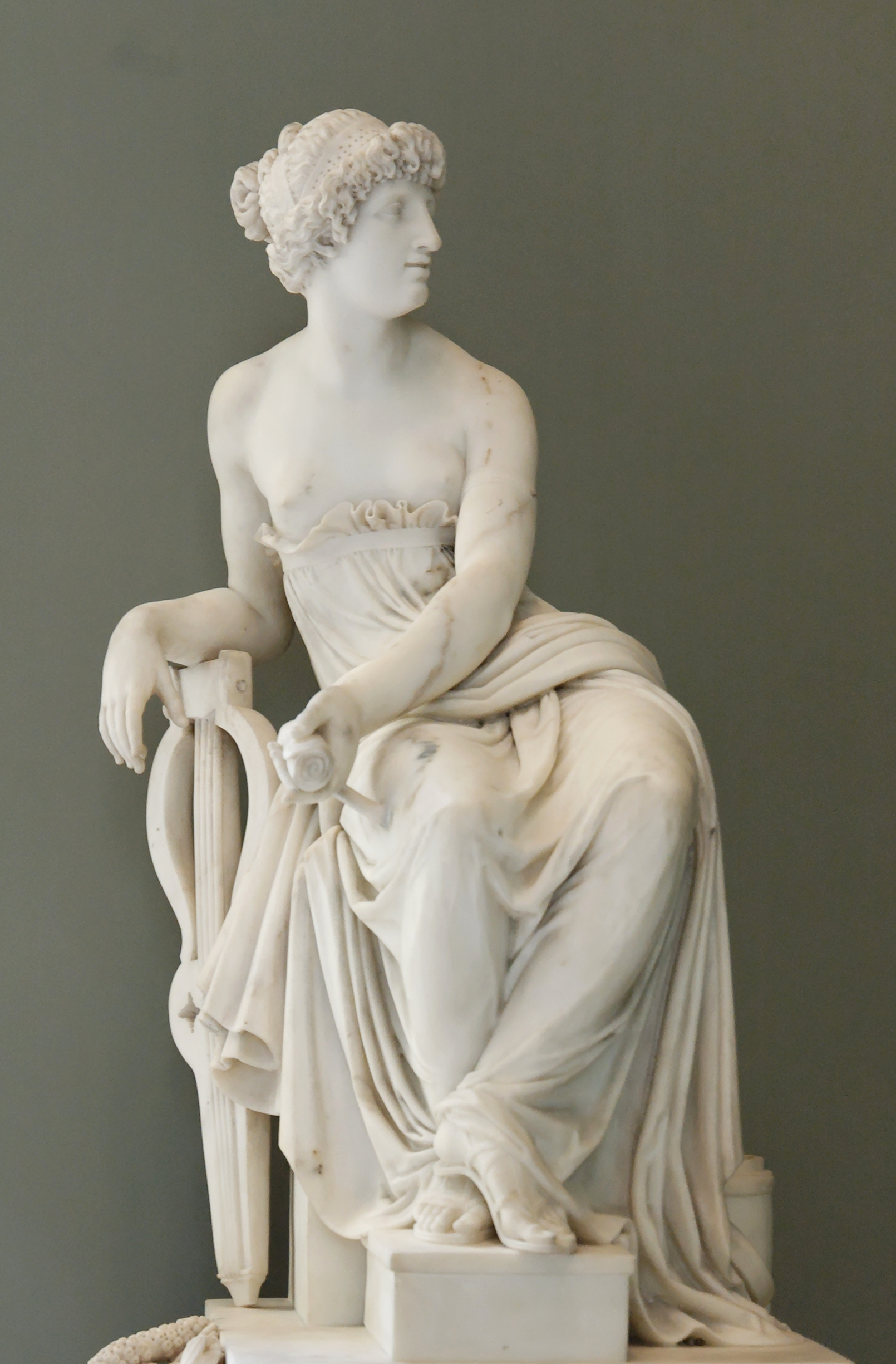
Sappho by Claude Ramey

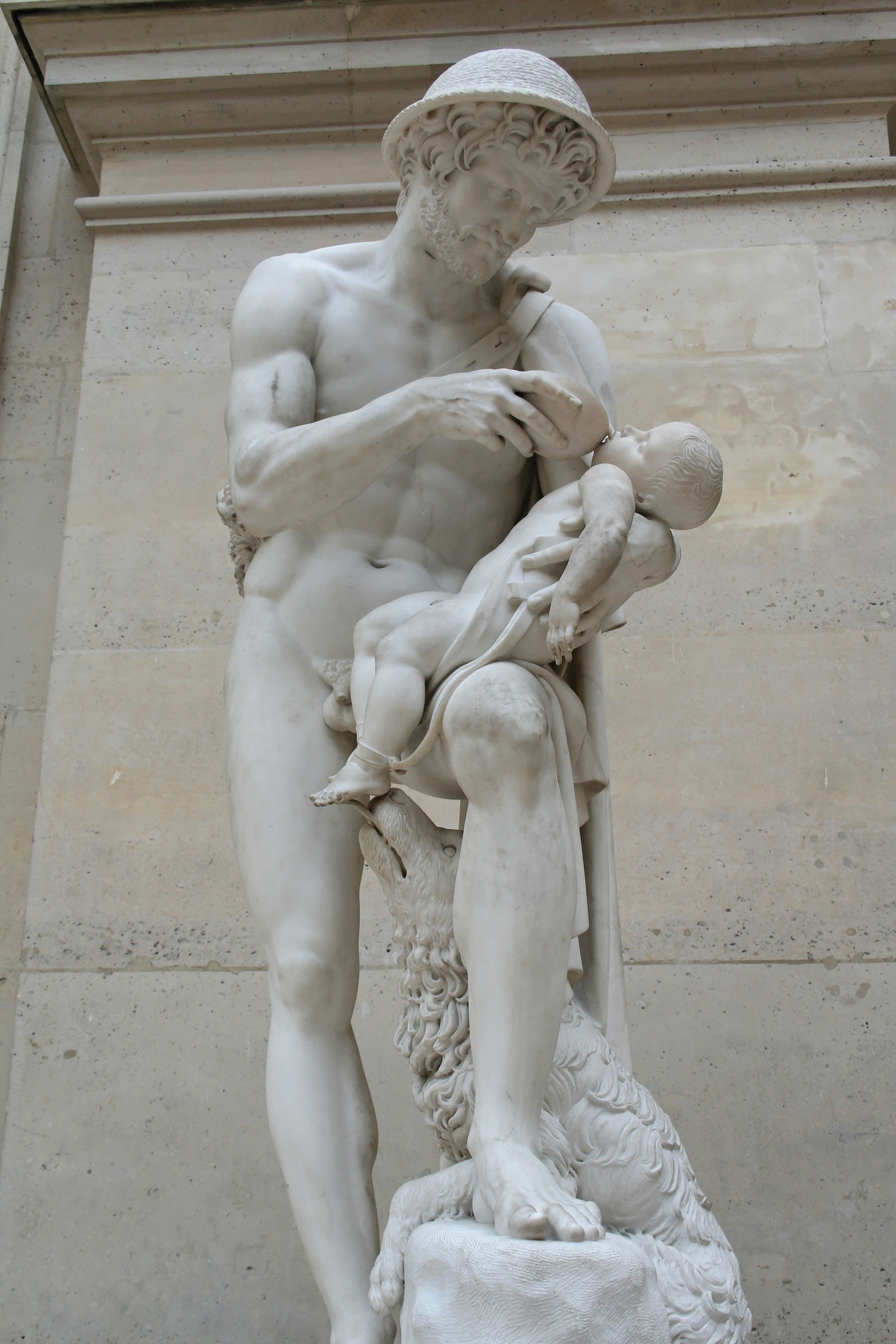
Oedipus and the Shepherd by Antoine-Denis Chaudet

== See also ==
- Royal Academy Exhibition of 1801, held at Somerset House in London by the Royal Academy earlier in the year
- Category:Artworks exhibited at the Salon of 1801

== Bibliography ==
- Baetjer, Katharine. French Paintings in The Metropolitan Museum of Art from the Early Eighteenth Century through the Revolution. Metropolitan Museum of Art, 2019.
- Boime, Albert. A Social History of Modern Art, Volume 2: Art in an Age of Bonapartism, 1800-1815. University of Chicago Press, 1993.
- DeLorme, Eleanor P. (ed ) Joséphine and the Arts of the Empire. J.P. Getty Museum, 2005.
- Hornstein, Katie. Picturing War in France, 1792–1856. Yale University Press, 2018.
- Porterfield, Todd & Siegfried, Susan L. Staging Empire: Napoleon, Ingres, and David. Pennsylvania State University, 2006.
