= Portrait of Pierre-Narcisse Guérin =

Painting by Robert Lefèvre

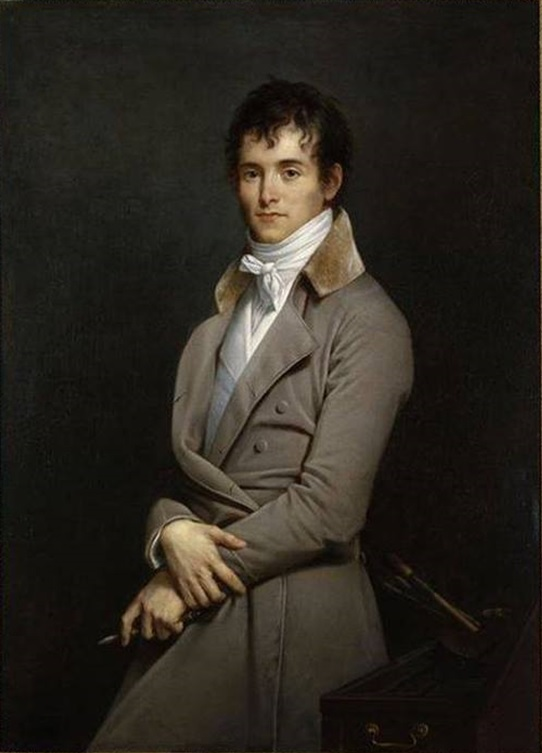
- Artist: Robert Lefèvre
- Year: 1801
- Type: Oil on canvas, portrait painting
- Dimensions: 109 cm × 80 cm (43 in × 31 in)
- Location: Musée des Beaux-Arts; Orléans

Portrait of Pierre-Narcisse Guérin is an 1801 portrait painting by the French artist Robert Lefèvre. It depicts his fellow painter Pierre-Narcisse Guérin, then known for his neoclassical history scenes. Guérin, who would later count Théodore Géricault and Eugène Delacroix amongst his pupils, is depicted in the elegant, fashionable early Empire style.

It was exhibited at the Salon of 1801 at the Louvre in Paris. Today it is in the collection of the Musée des Beaux-Arts d'Orléans.

== Bibliography ==
- Chastel, André. L'art français: Le temps de l'éloquence. Flammarion, 1993.
- Crow, Thomas. Emulation: David, Drouais, and Girodet in the Art of Revolutionary France. Yale University Press, 2006.
- Le Bourhis, Katell (ed.) The Age of Napoleon: Costume from Revolution to Empire, 1789-1815. Metropolitan Museum of Art, 1989.
