= The Battle of Marengo (painting) =

1801 painting by Louis-François Lejeune

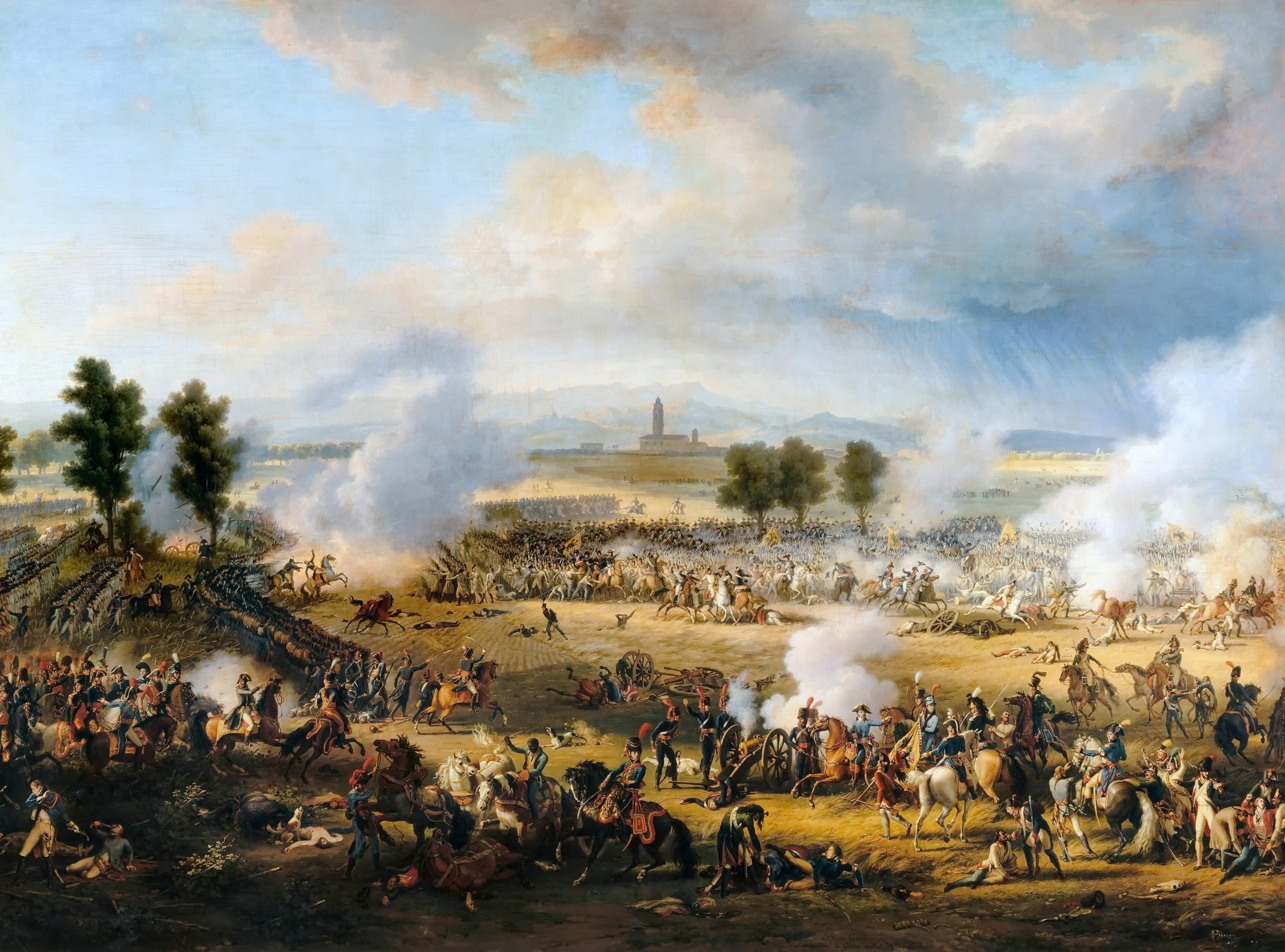
- Artist: Louis-François Lejeune
- Year: 1801
- Type: History painting
- Medium: Oil on canvas
- Dimensions: 180 cm × 250 cm (71 in × 98 in)
- Location: Palace of Versailles, Versailles

The Battle of Marengo (French: La bataille de Marengo) is an oil on canvas history painting by the French artist Louis-François Lejeune, from 1801.

== History and description ==
It features a panoramic view of the Battle of Marengo, fought on 14 June 1800 in Northern Italy during the French Revolutionary Wars. Napoleon Bonaparte led the French Army of Italy to victory over Austrian troops.

The work combines a number of noted incidents from the battle, shown all taking place at once, including the charge of General François Étienne de Kellermann's cavalry and the death of Louis Desaix. Lejeune, who was present at the battle, adds a self-portrait of himself beside Louis-Alexandre Berthier.

The painting was displayed at the Salon of 1801 at the Louvre in Paris, a sketch for the picture having been displayed at the Salon of 1800. It was acquired by the French state in 1861 and is now in the collection of the Palace of Versailles.

== Bibliography ==
- Stevens, Adam. Landscape Painting in Revolutionary France: Liberty's Embrace. Routledge, 2019.
- Hornstein, Katie. Picturing War in France, 1792–1856. Yale University Press, 2018.
