= Sappho at Leucate =

Painting by Antoine-Jean Gros

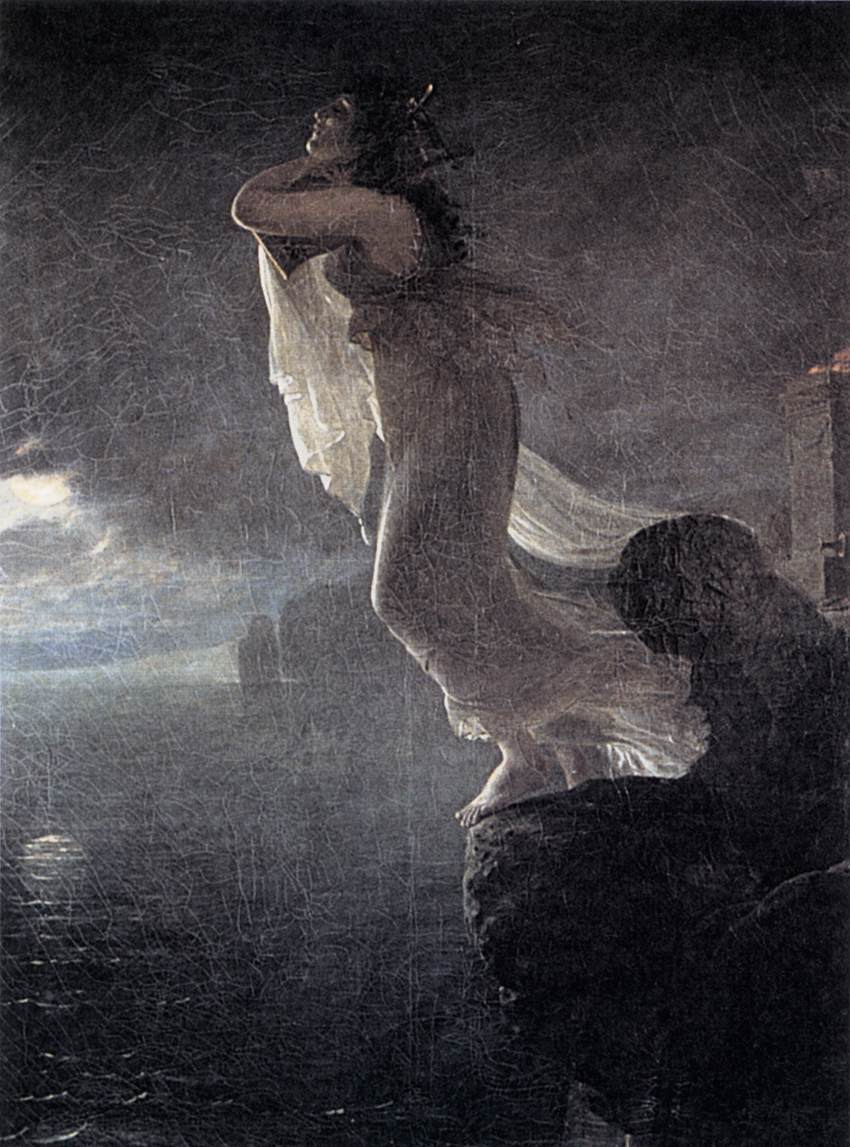
- Artist: Antoine-Jean Gros
- Year: 1801
- Medium: Oil on canvas
- Dimensions: 122 cm × 100 cm (48 in × 39 in)
- Location: Musée d'Art et d'Histoire Baron-Gérard, Bayeux

Sappho at Leucate, also known as The Death of Sappho, is an oil-on-canvas painting executed by the French artist Antoine-Jean Gros in 1801. It measures 122 x 100 cm and is held in the Musée d'Art et d'Histoire Baron-Gérard, in Bayeux. The painting mixes the structured style that Gros learned from Jacques-Louis David with a more romantic approach full of emotion and drama. When the painting was shown during the Salon of 1801, it drew attention and was later reproduced and adapted in several prints which helped to make this painting more widely known.

== Description and style ==
The painting depicts Ancient Greek poet Sappho's alleged suicide, in which she leaps from the cliffs of Lefkada out of despair over an unrequited love for the mythological Phaon.

In the painting, Gros presents Sappho standing at the edge of a steep cliff, illuminated by rays of moonlight, reflecting across the dark and looming sea below her. She holds a translucent veil and raises her lyre, while a small altar appears behind her. The dramatic contrast between Sappho's figure (lit by the moon) and the surrounding darkness heightens the emotional intensity behind the scene.

Nineteenth-century writers such as Charles Blanc noticed Gros's shift towards a more emotional style. Blanc argued in 1845 that "undertaking the pictorial representation of despair represented a fundamental deviation from the principles of Greek art". Art historian William Vaughan noted that the painting demonstrated how a deeply emotional effect could be conveyed "as much through precision as through bravura."

== Interpretation ==
Art historian David O'Brien points out that the painting departs from the traditional representation of suicide in Neoclassical painting, where self-sacrifice was traditionally presented as a heroic act with a moral purpose.

Dorothy Johnson places the painting within the rise of Romantic mythology, where previously classical subjects were reimagined to be emotionally charged narratives rather than the usual moral stories. She notes that Gros presents Sappho "in ecstasy" and that the translucent clothing blowing in the wind "emblematizes her fragile, tenuous attachment to the terrestrial realm."

== Reception and later influence ==
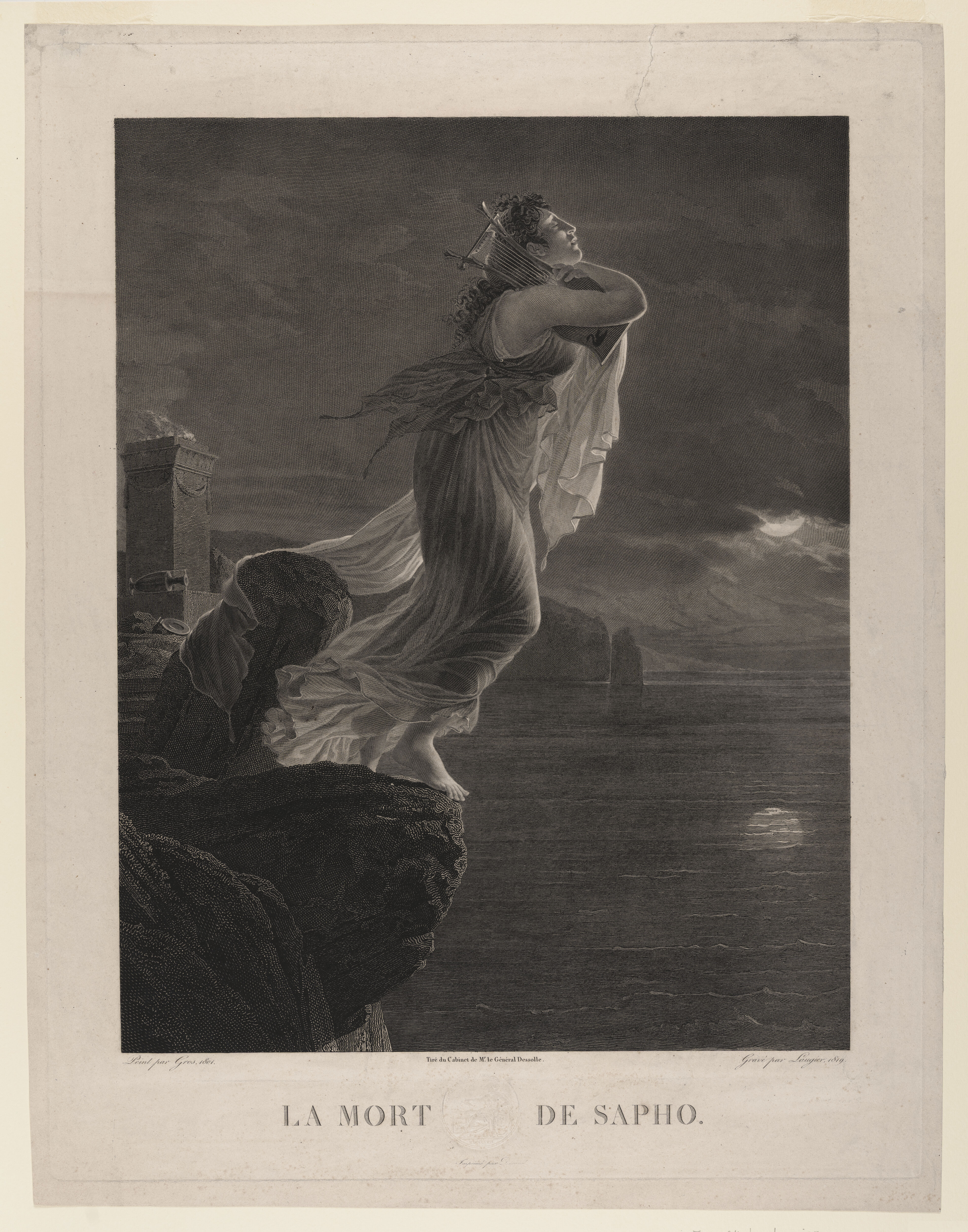
Laugier's print of the painting from 1819

The early attention led to the painting being widely reproduced, specifically in prints. Engravings by Jean Nicolas Laugier and a lithograph by Mme. Renaudin helped preserve and spread the painting beyond its original exhibition.

These prints also made the painting more accessible to later artists, including Honoré Daumier, who later adopted Gros's composition in his lithograph "La mort de Sappho." According to Jacquelynn Baas Slee, Daumier's lithograph mimics Gros's own composition. His version keeps the cliffside setting and Sappho's general pose but adds his own twist. Daumier adds a mischievous looking Cupid pushing Sappho forwards, taking away the solemness of the original painting by adding bit of humor and completely changing the tone.

More recent scholars have examined Sappho at Leucate in the context of gender, mythology, and emotion in early nineteenth-century art. Johnson notes that mythological heroines in early nineteenth-century paintings often represented emotional extremes or moral vulnerability that appealed to Romantic audiences. O'Brien observes that Gros's exploration of a tragic female subject proved a dead end for him, and he soon turned toward the militaristic imagery that would make him a favored painter under Napoleon.
