= Brutus Condemning His Sons to Death =

Painting by Guillaume Guillon-Lethière

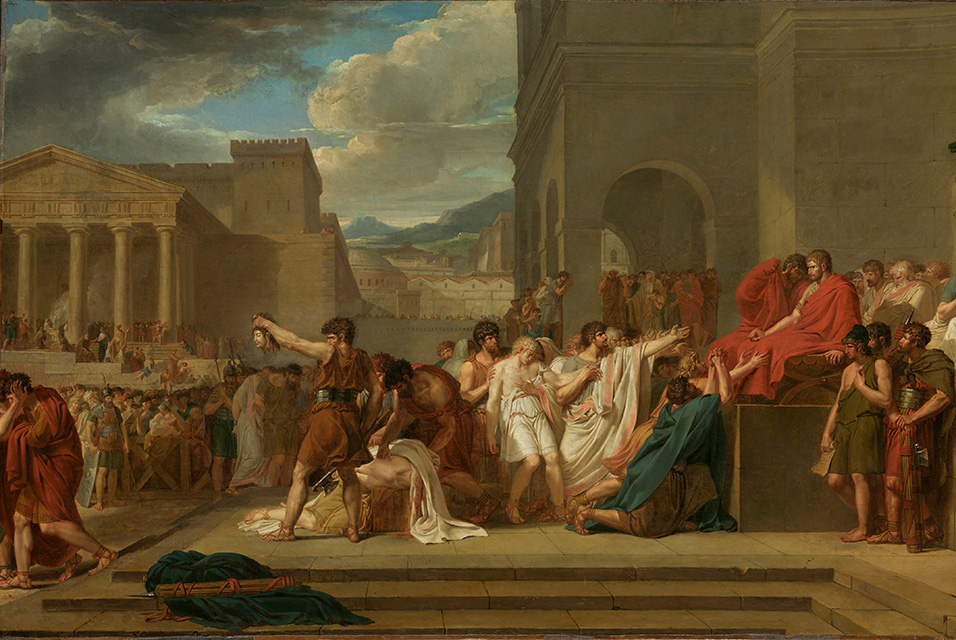
- Artist: Guillaume Guillon-Lethière
- Year: 1788
- Medium: Oil on canvas
- Dimensions: 59.4 cm × 99.1 cm (23.4 in × 39.0 in)
- Location: Clark Art Institute, Williamstown, Massachusetts

Brutus Condemning His Sons to Death is a 1788 painting by the Guadeloupe-born French Neoclassical painter Guillaume Guillon-Lethière (1760–1832). It depicts the legendary founder of the Roman Republic, Lucius Junius Brutus, who overthrew Lucius Tarquinius Superbus, the last King of Rome. The painting shows Brutus stoically watching the execution of his sons, Tiberius Junius Brutus and Titus Junius Brutus, after sentencing them to death for plotting to restore the Tarquin monarchy.

In 2018, the Clark Art Institute in Williamstown, Massachusetts acquired the painting as well as a preparatory drawing for it from a private collection.

== Context ==
In 509 BC, Brutus led a revolution to overthrow the monarchy and establish the Roman Republic, seeking to create a more equitable balance of power. When Brutus then discovered that his sons were involved in a plot to reestablish the monarchy, he sentenced them to death. By punishing his own children for their betrayal, Brutus demonstrated his steadfast and resolute commitment to the ideals of justice and the rule of law, placing the Republic's principles above personal ties. His actions were frequently referenced as embodying values of selflessness and sacrifice; duty over self-interest.

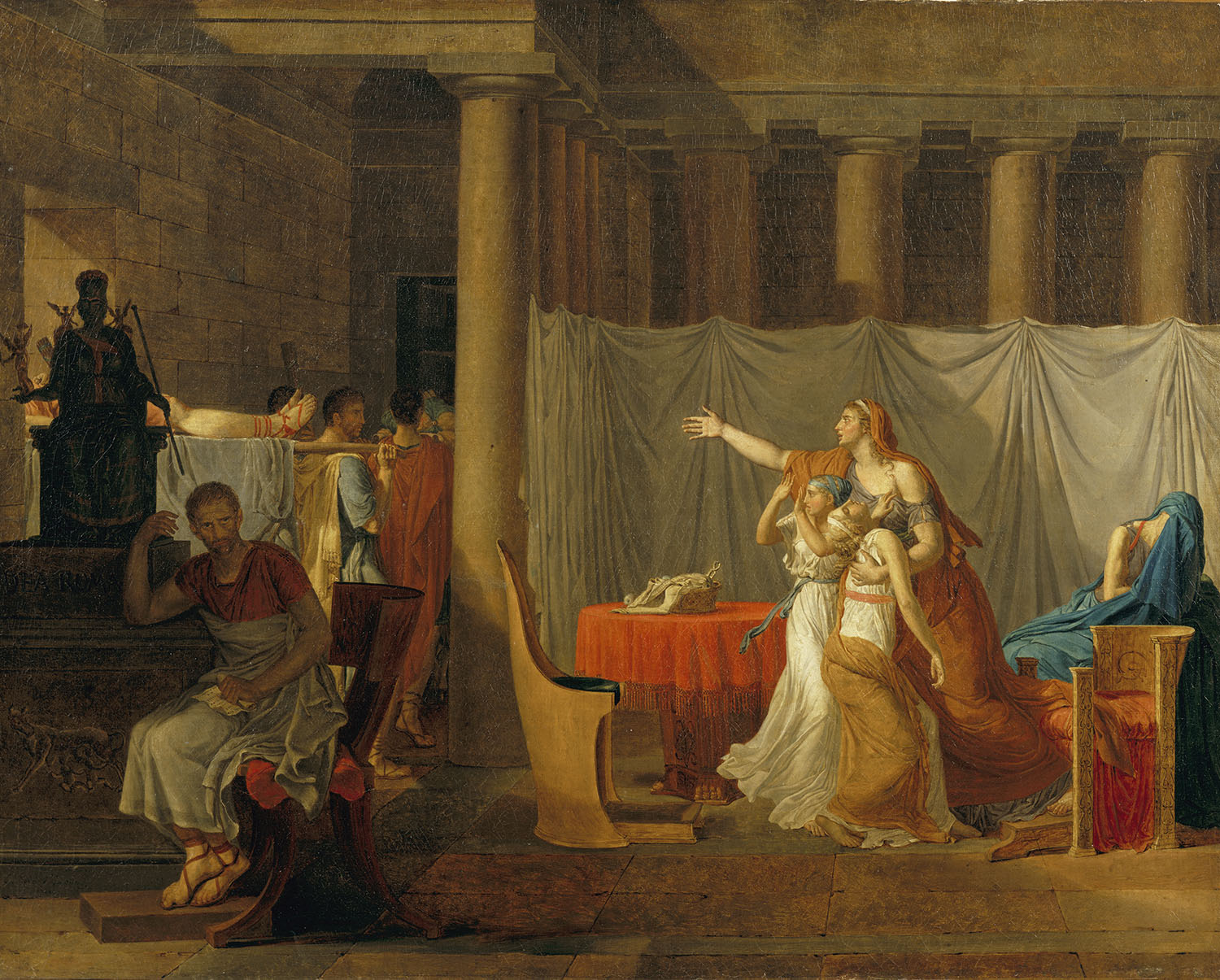
The Lictors Bringing to Brutus the Bodies of his Sons, Jacques-Louis David, 1789

In 1788, Lethière turned to the subject as part of the larger Neoclassical art movement, which often drew on scenes from ancient Rome and Greece to emphasize virtues such as patriotism, sacrifice, and civic duty. Neoclassicism gained particular popularity in the late 18th century, resonating with Enlightenment ideals and reflecting the political tensions of the era, especially with the approaching French Revolution.

Lethière was possibly influenced to depict such a scene after his classmate at the Académie Royale received critical praise for work portraying the same Roman era.

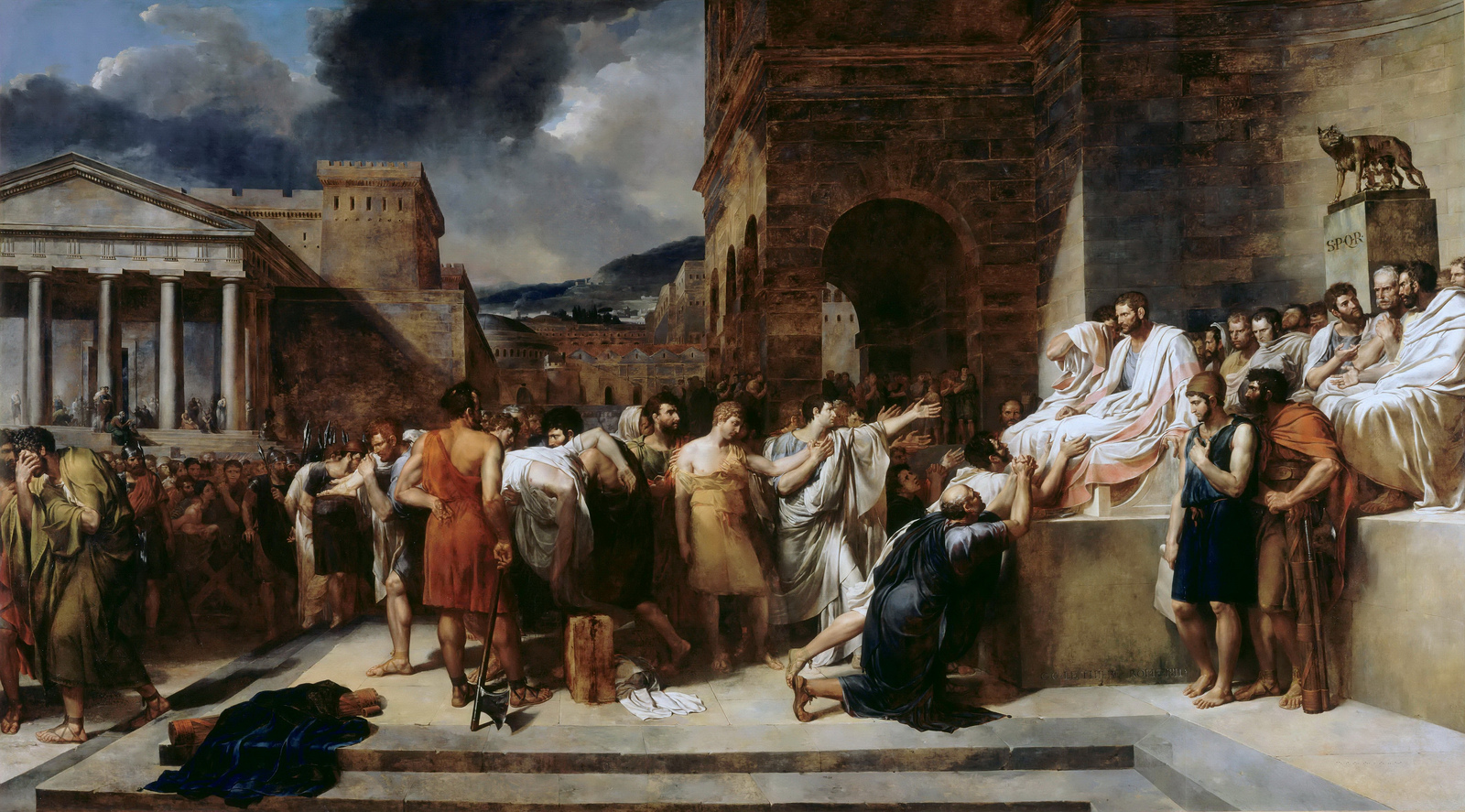
The second painting of the series, Brutus Condemning His Sons to Death, Guillaume Guillon-Lethière, 1811

Lethière's famous contemporary, Jacques-Louis David, covered a similar historical subject in his work The Lictors Bring to Brutus the Bodies of His Sons (1789). Due to specific similarities in the figures depicted in both paintings, some art historians suggest that the two artists corresponded while working on their respective pieces.

This work is the first of two Lethière created with this subject and title. Lethière completed the second one in 1811, enlarging the composition to enormous size (4.4 m x 7.83 m, more than seven times the height and width of the original). This second painting is in the permanent collection of the Louvre in Paris.

== Analysis and reception ==
In this work, Lethière contrasts violence and shock with stoicism. Although the execution scene in the foreground is most prominent, the distinct Roman architecture in the background lends a feeling of historic importance and permanence. There is a purposeful lack of harmony to demonstrate the surprise of the event. The figures in the foreground are arranged in dynamic, chaotic poses, reflecting the emotional upheaval and the violence of the moment. Romans on their knees extend their arms out to Brutus, seemingly begging him to spare the lives of his own children. At the left edge of the composition, a man cowers from the sight of the severed head. Brutus, seated apart, remains detached and stoic as he watches his orders carried out. The headless body of one of his sons, still kneeling over the executioner's block, is barely covered and almost fully visible.

The work as a whole seeks to immortalize selfless, moral actions. However, upon being displayed in 1795 and 1801 at the respective Salons, it was thought to be too closely reflecting the violent events of the French Revolution. It drew criticism for its explicit violence, and some interpreted Lethière's work as support for political murder and the Reign of Terror. These accusations were furthered by the resemblance between the executioner in Lethière's painting and Charles-Henri Sanson, the man who displayed King Louis XVI’s severed head to a Parisian crowd.

Nevertheless, many art critics found merits in Lethière's work. Although the subject had been covered before, Lethière’s choice to focus on the immediate aftermath of the act, rather than its buildup or resolution, was praised for its grandeur and impressive attention to detail. To those who interpreted the painting with less political symbolism, the subtle heroics of the historical account are on full display.
