= Robert Lefèvre =

French painter (1755–1830)

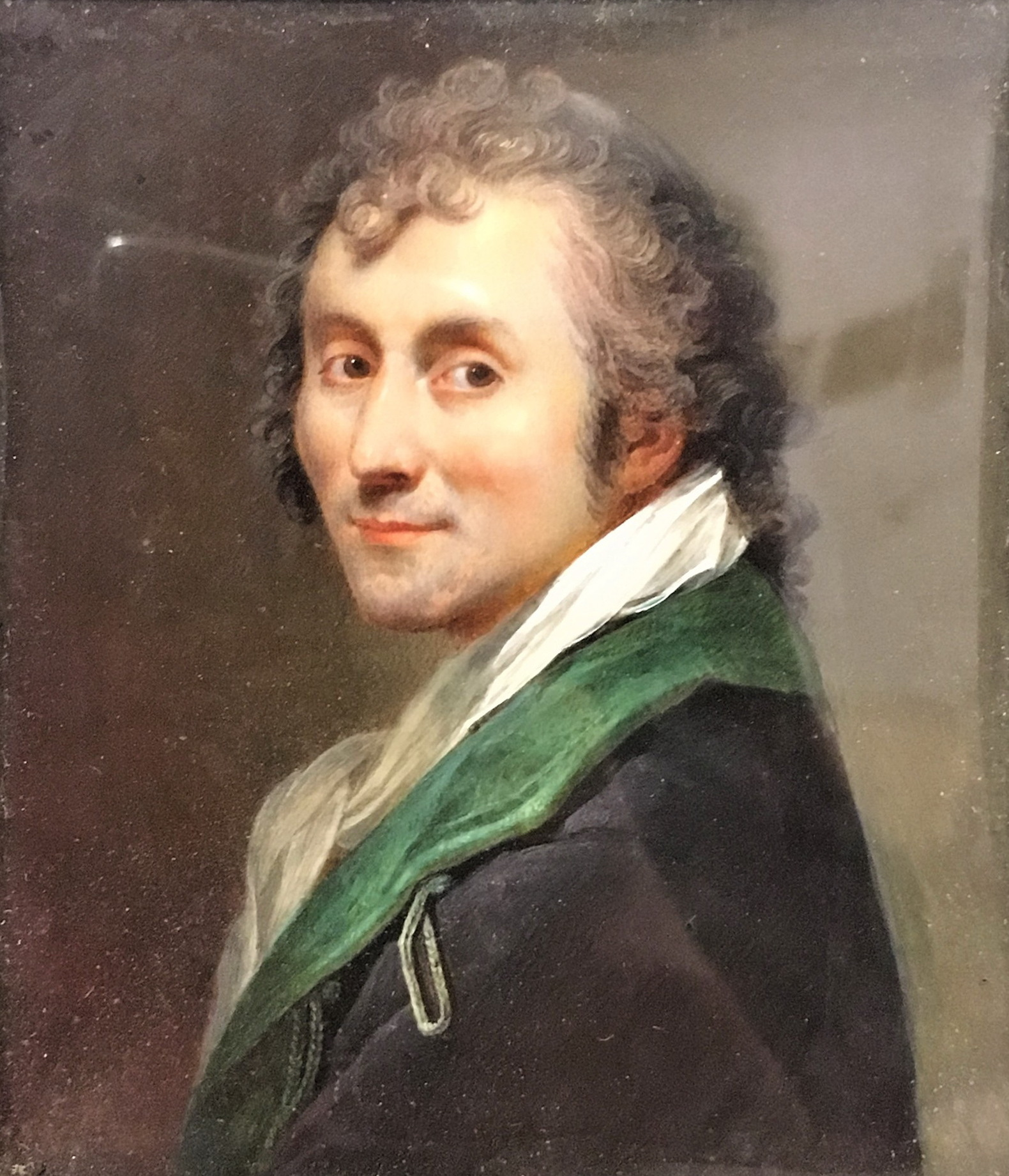
Self-portrait of Lefèvre

Robert Jacques François Faust Lefèvre (French pronunciation: [ʁɔbɛʁ ʒak fʁɑ̃swa fɔst ləfɛvʁ], 24 September 1755 – 3 October 1830) was a French painter who specialised in portrait painting, history painting and religious art. He was heavily influenced by Jacques-Louis David and his style is reminiscent of the antique.

== Life ==
Elisabeth Alexandrovna Stroganoff, countess Demidoff (1779–1818) - Hermitage Museum, St Petersburg.

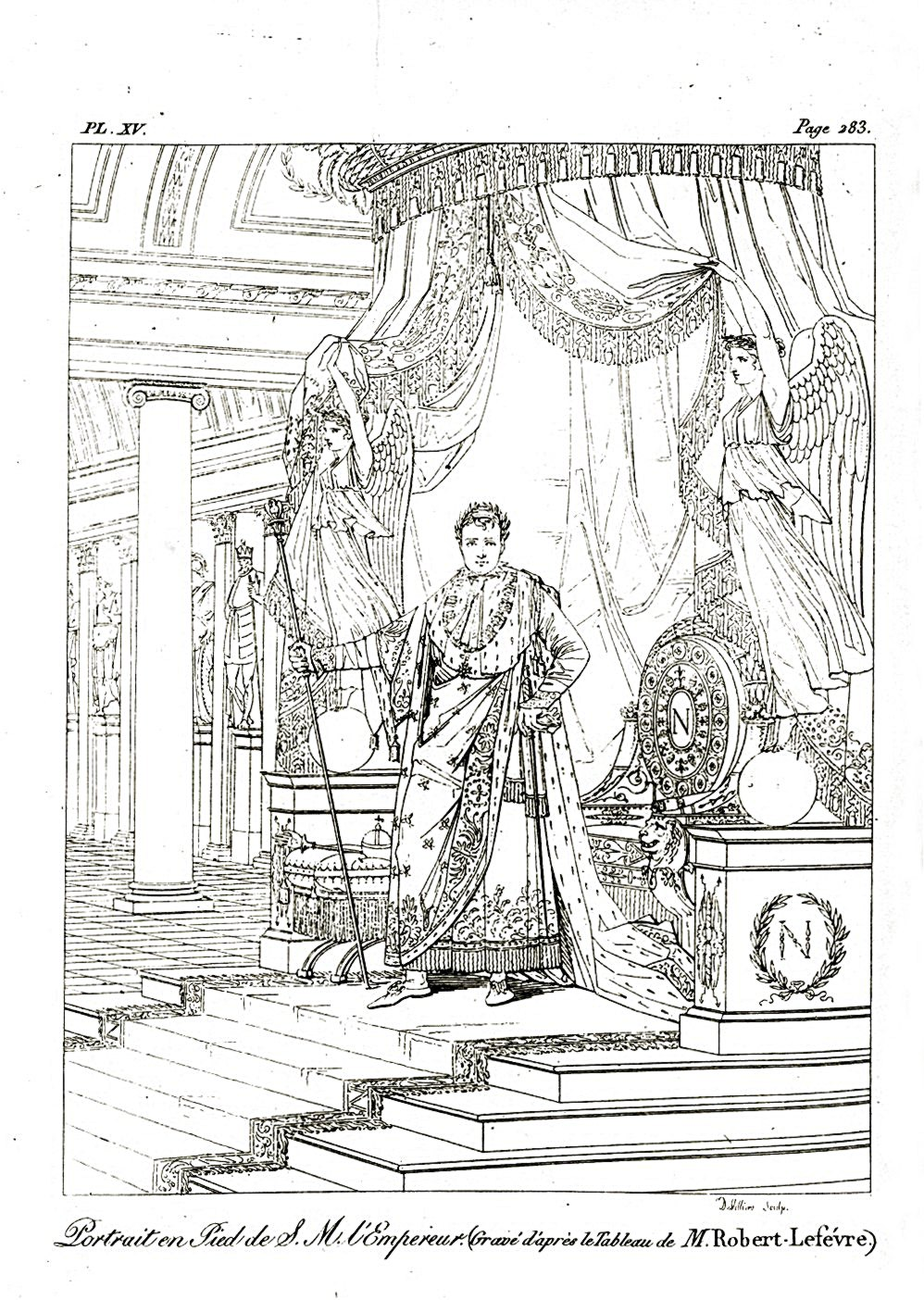
Engraving of Robert Lefèvre's Portrait of Napoleon in his coronation costume, engraving in the treatise by the Pausanias français after the exhibition of this portrait at the 1806 Salon at the same time as Ingres's Napoleon I on his Imperial Throne

Robert Lefèvre made his first drawings on the papers of a procureur to whom his father had apprenticed him. With his parents' consent, he abandoned this apprenticeship and walked from Caen to Paris to become a student of Jean-Baptiste Regnault (in whose studio he met and became friends with Charles Paul Landon). At the 1791 Paris Salon he exhibited his Dame en velours noir, the point of departure for his reputation. In 1805, Lefèvre painted the portrait of Empress Joséphine, and in 1807 a matching portrait of Napoléon was painted by Louis-André-Gabriel Bouchet. Napoléon gave both paintings to the city of Aachen in 1807, where they are today in the city hall and decorate the entrance hall.

His other portraits of Napoleon, Joséphine, Madame Laetitia, Guérin, Carle Vernet (a portrait which is now at the Louvre) and pope Pius VII made him a fashionable portrait artist and one of the main portraitists of the imperial personalities, a reputation sealed by his portrait of Napoleon's new wife Marie Louise.

On the Bourbon Restoration Robert Lefèvre painted a portrait of Louis XVIII for the Chambre des Pairs and received the cross of the Légion d'honneur and the title of First Painter to the King, losing the latter on the July Revolution. He painted a large number of portraits and history paintings. The main example of his portraits are those of Malherbe (Bibliothèque publique de Caen), Charles X, the duchesse d’Angoulême, the duchesse de Berry, Charles-Pierre-François Augereau duc de Castiglione (Musée de Versailles), and of Dominique Vivant Denon. Two of his mythological paintings - Love sharpening his arrows and Love disarmed by Venus (t. 1,84 sur 1,30), were engraved by Desnoyers - the latter is reproduced in le Nu Ancien et Moderne. His most notable history paintings are his Phocion getting ready to drink hemlock, Roger delivering Angélique, Héloïse and Abelard and a Crucifixion for the Mont Valérien. His last painting was The Apotheosis of Saint Louis for the Cathedral of La Rochelle.

While he was working on this last painting, the Revolution of July 1830 took place, an event which was to deprive him of his support and official posts. Ill, depressed and desperate, he committed suicide by cutting his throat at his house on the night of 2/3 October 1830; he was 75 years old. He was buried in the Père Lachaise Cemetery, in Paris.

== Gallery ==
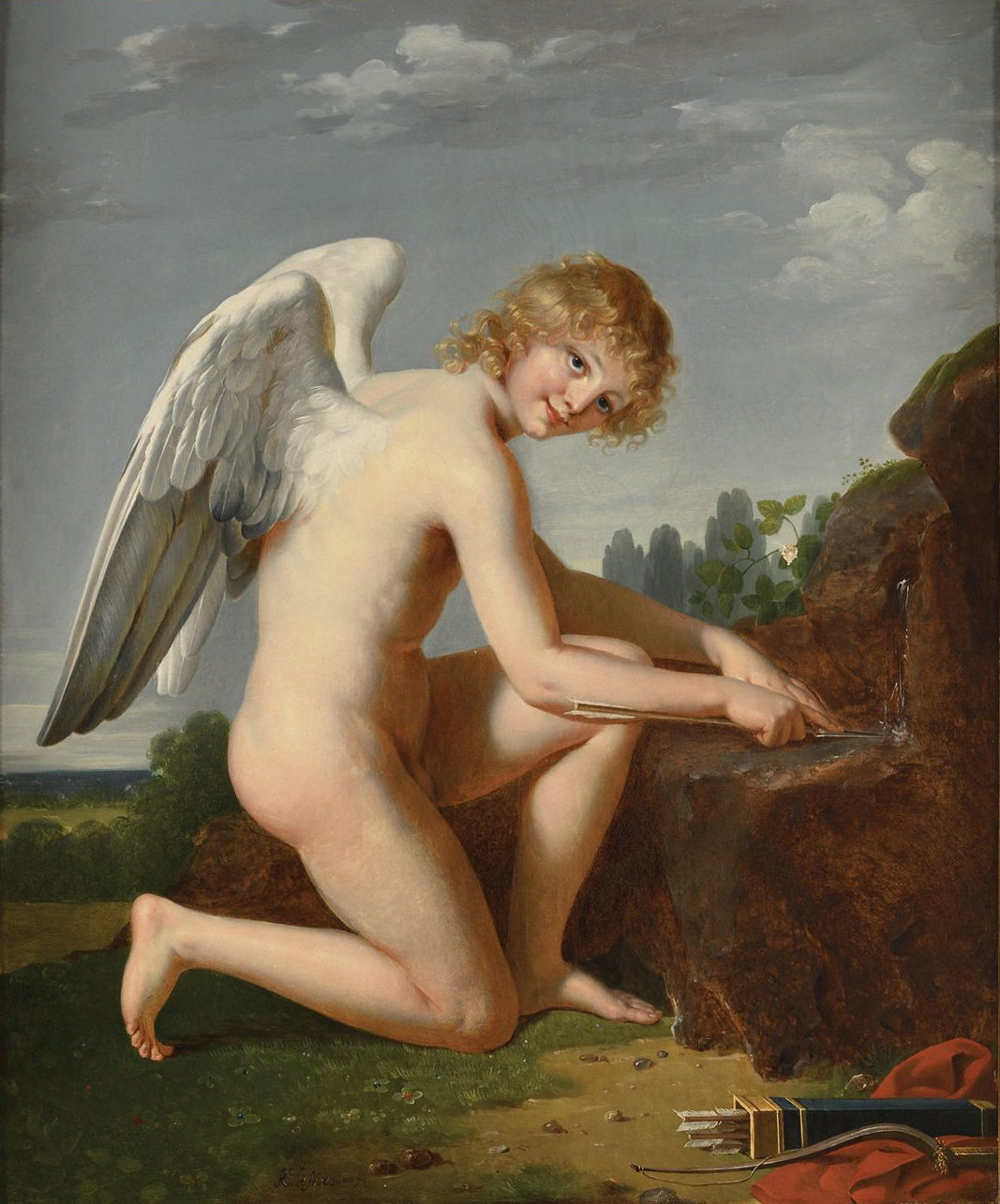
Cupid sharpening his arrows (1798)

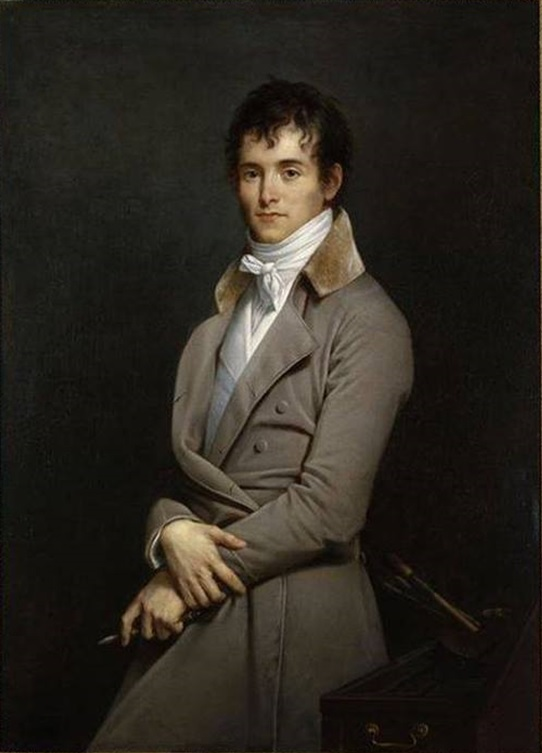
Portrait of Pierre-Narcisse Guérin (1801)

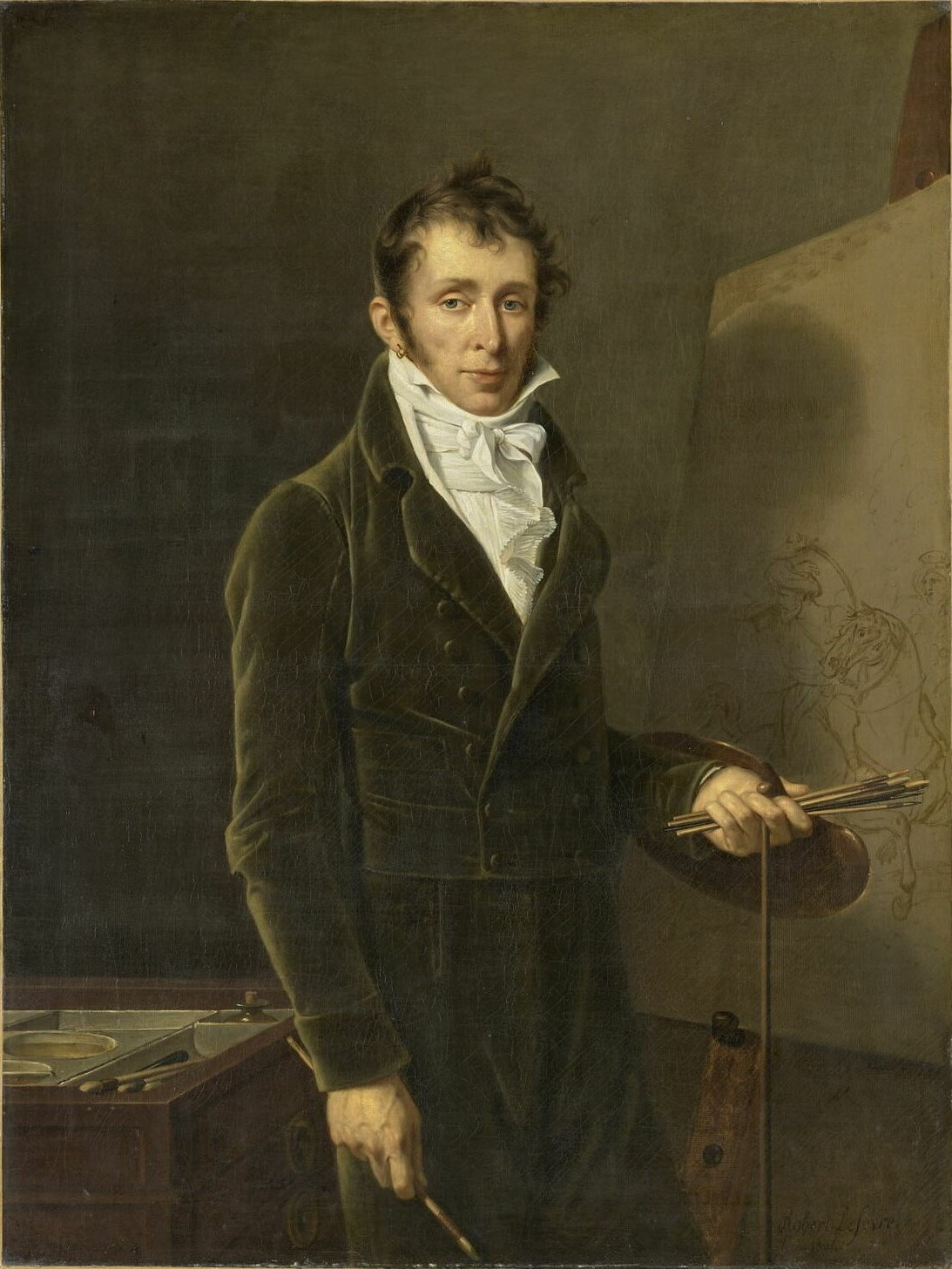
Portrait of Carle Vernet, 1804

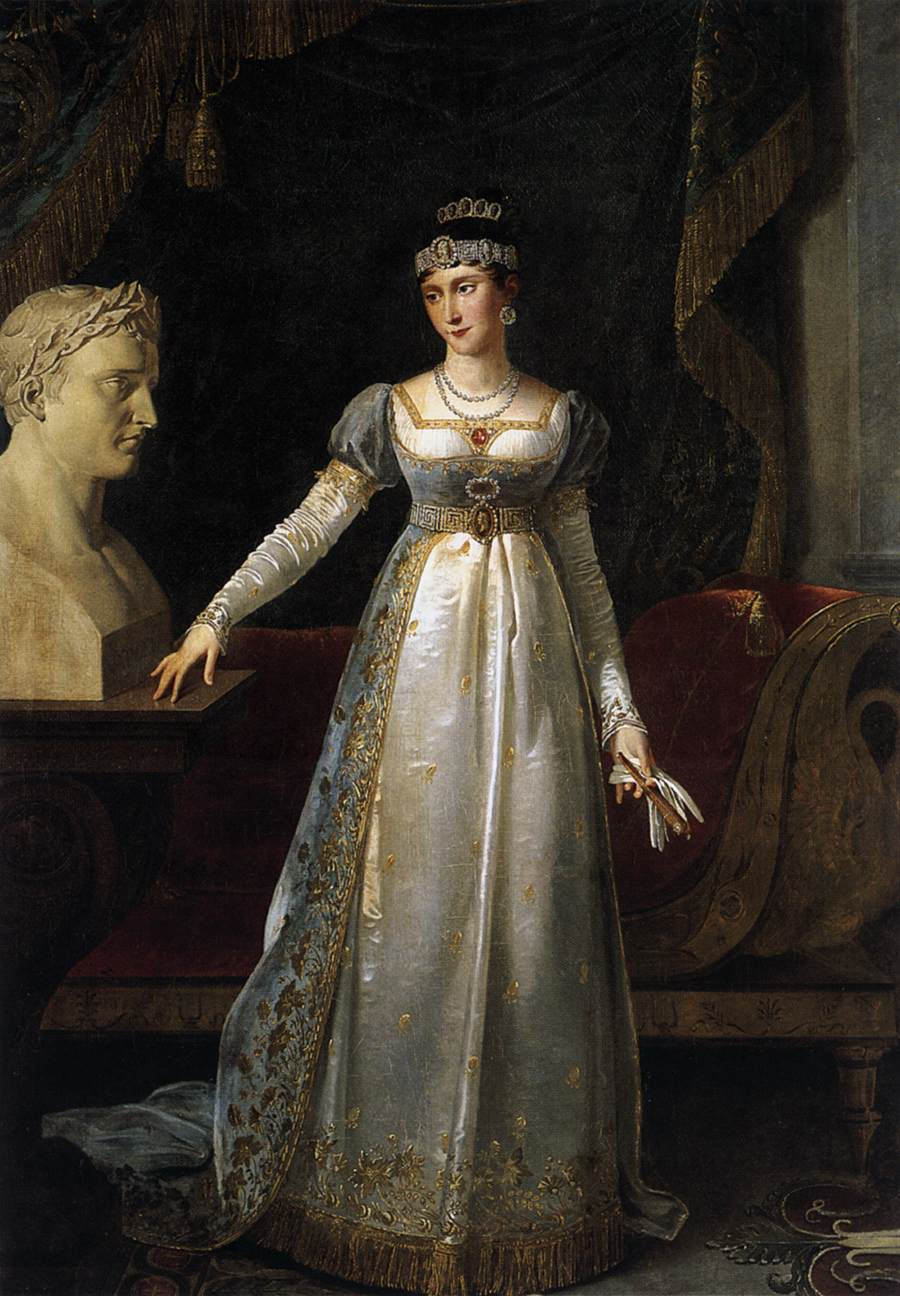
Princess Pauline Borghese (1806)

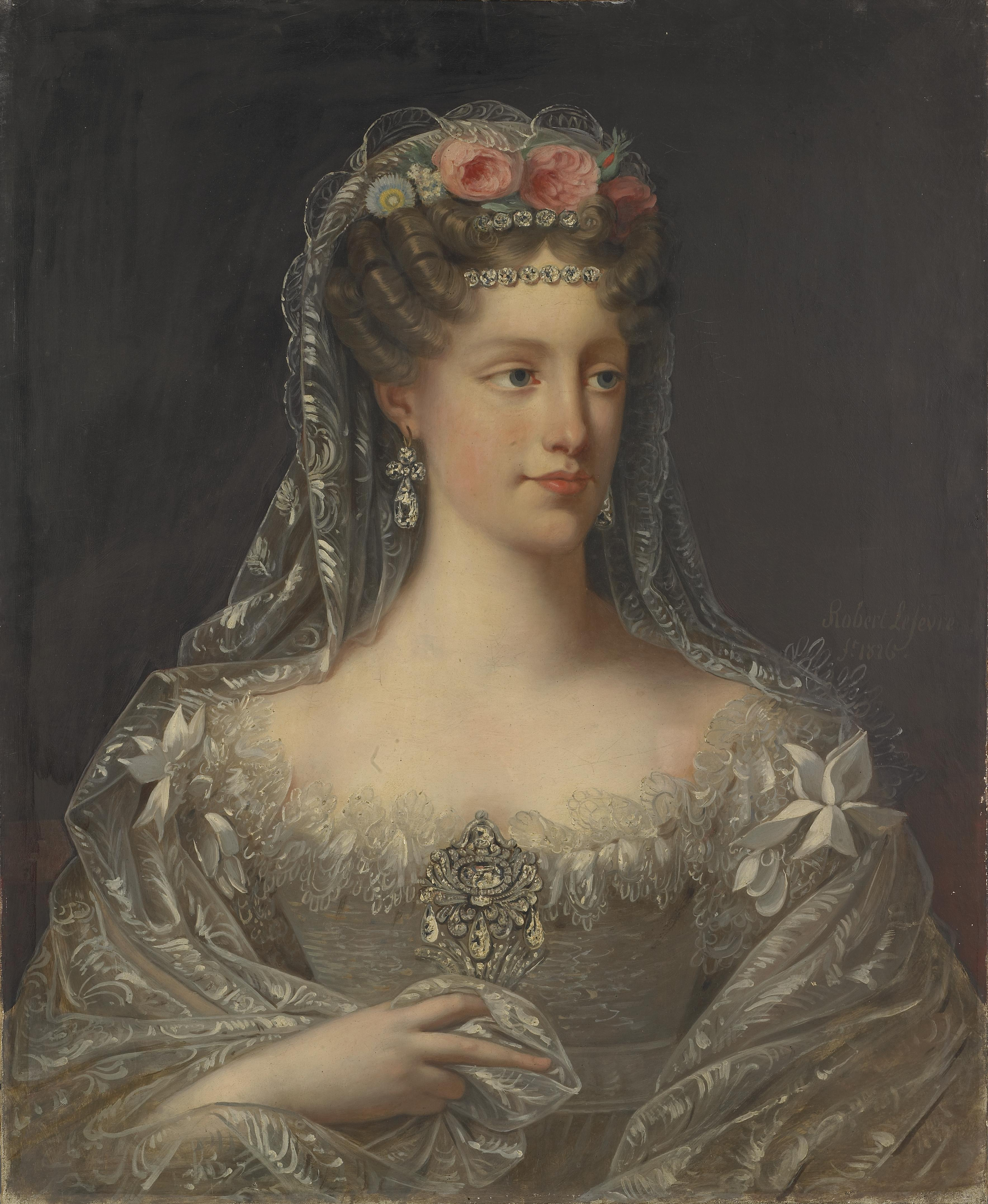
Portrait of the Duchess of Berry (1826)

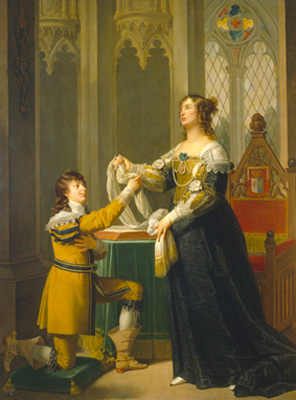
Maria Baryatinskaya (1819)

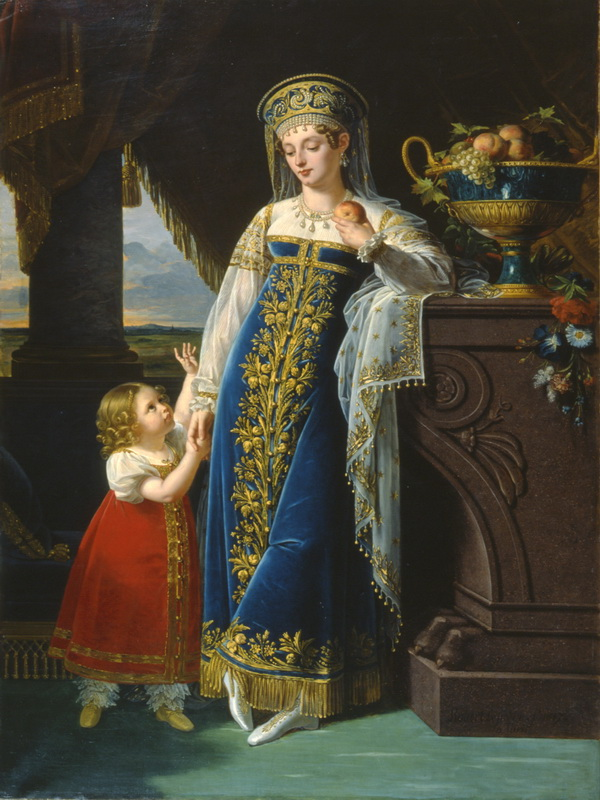
M.F. Baryatinskaya with daughter Olga (1817)

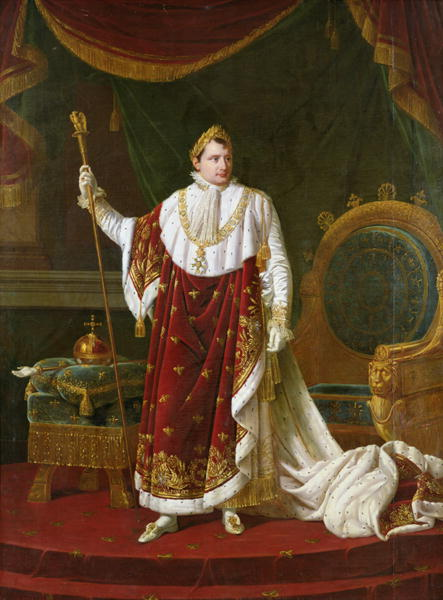
Portrait of Napoleon in Coronation Robes (1811)
