= Claude Ramey =

French sculptor

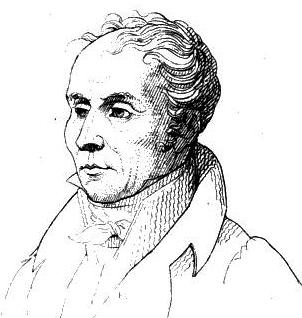
Drawing of Ramey by J. M. N. Frémy

Claude Ramey (29 October 1754 – 4 June 1838) was a French sculptor.

== Life ==
Ramey was born in Dijon and received his art training in the École de Dessin in that city under François Devosge. He then went to Paris and studied Sculpture with Étienne-Pierre-Adrien Gois. In 1782, he won the Prix de Rome and was subsequently a pensionnaire at the French Academy in Rome from 1782 to 1786.

Between 1806 and 1810 he was engaged on the bas reliefs on the Vendôme Column in Paris. In 1817, he was elected to the Academie des Beaux Arts; amongst his students was Jean-Pierre Cortot. In 1828, he produced a monumental statue of Cardinal Richelieu which was installed at Richelieu, Indre-et-Loire.

Ramey died in Paris in June 1838. He was the father of Étienne-Jules Ramey (1796–1852), also a sculptor.

== Works ==
- Napoléon I in coronation robes (Paris, Louvre Museum).
- Napoleon I evokes Minerva, Mercury and the deities of Peace etc (1811, relief, Louvre Museum).
- Sappho (1801, marble statue, Louvre Museum).
- L'Entrevue de Tilsit (marble bas-relief, Paris, Arc de Triomphe du Carrousel.
- Naiad (statue, Medici Fountain, Paris, Jardin du Luxembourg).
- Eugène de Beauharnais, Viceroy of (1781-1824) (1810, marble statue, Palace of Versailles).
- Cardinal Richelieu (1828, Marble statue at Place Aristide-Briand, Richelieu (Indre-et-Loire).
- Minerve instruisant la jeunesse (1787, terracotta, Musée de la Révolution française)

== Gallery ==
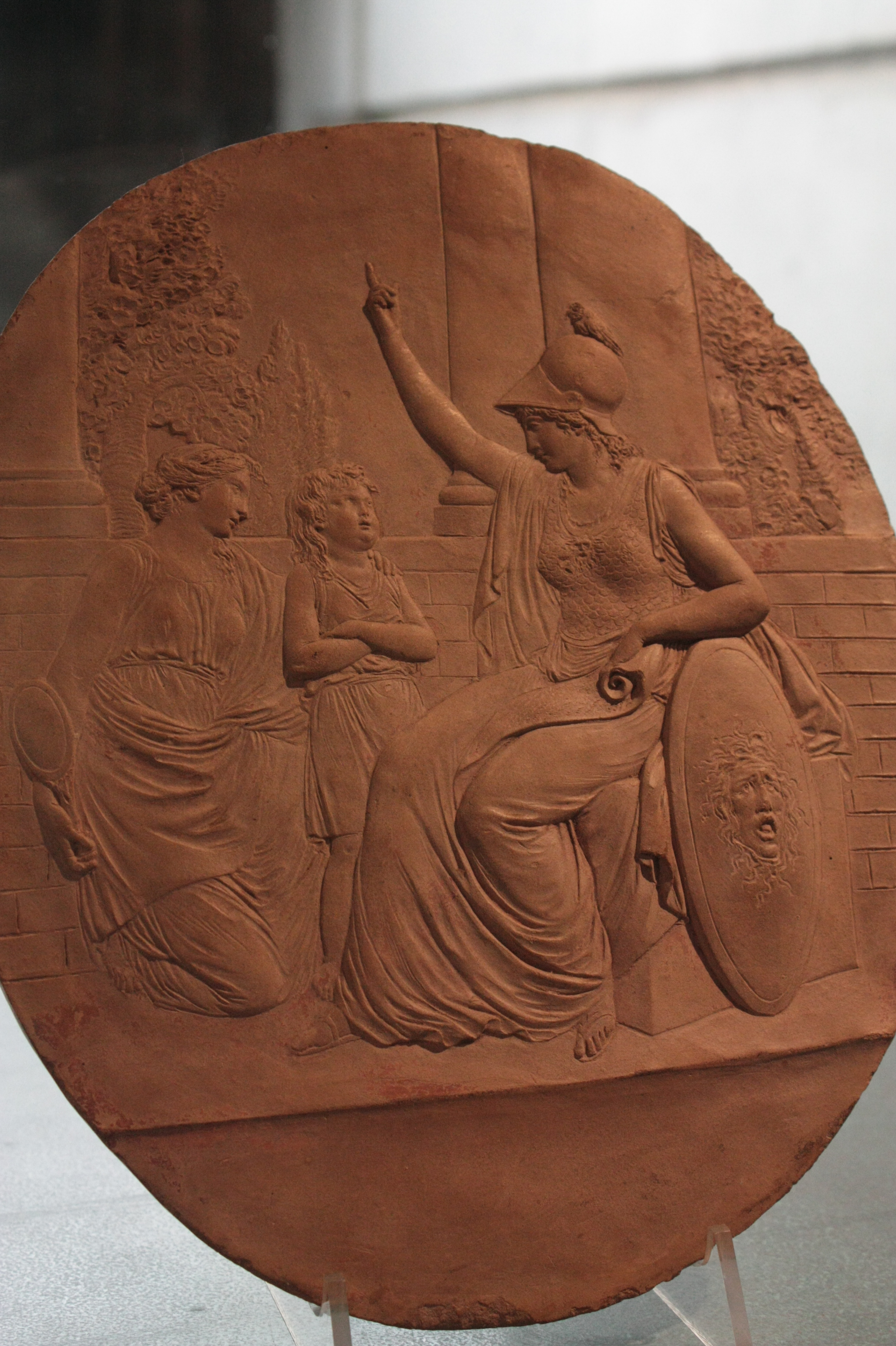
Minerve instruisant la jeunesse (c. 1787)

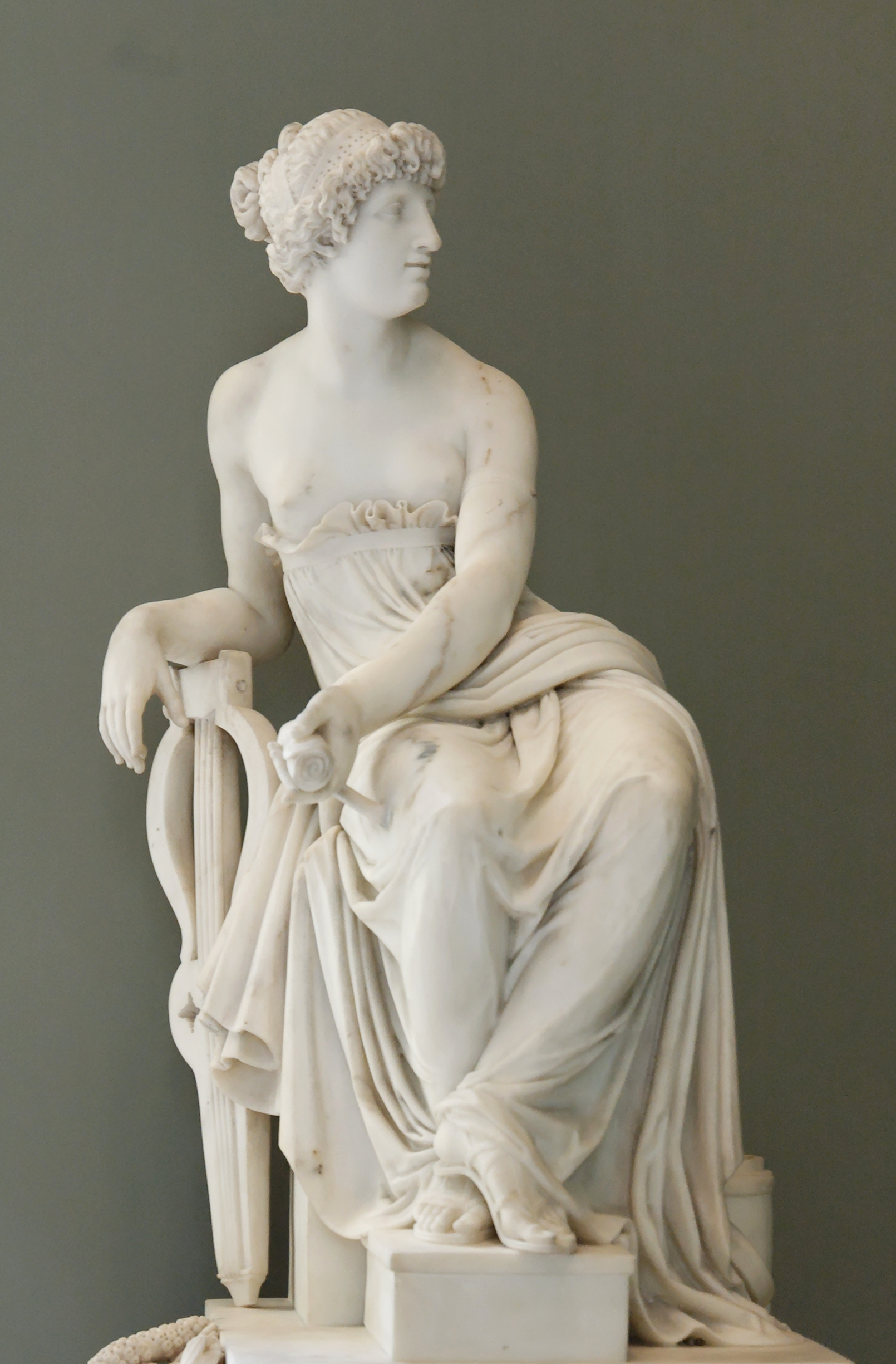
Sappho (1801)

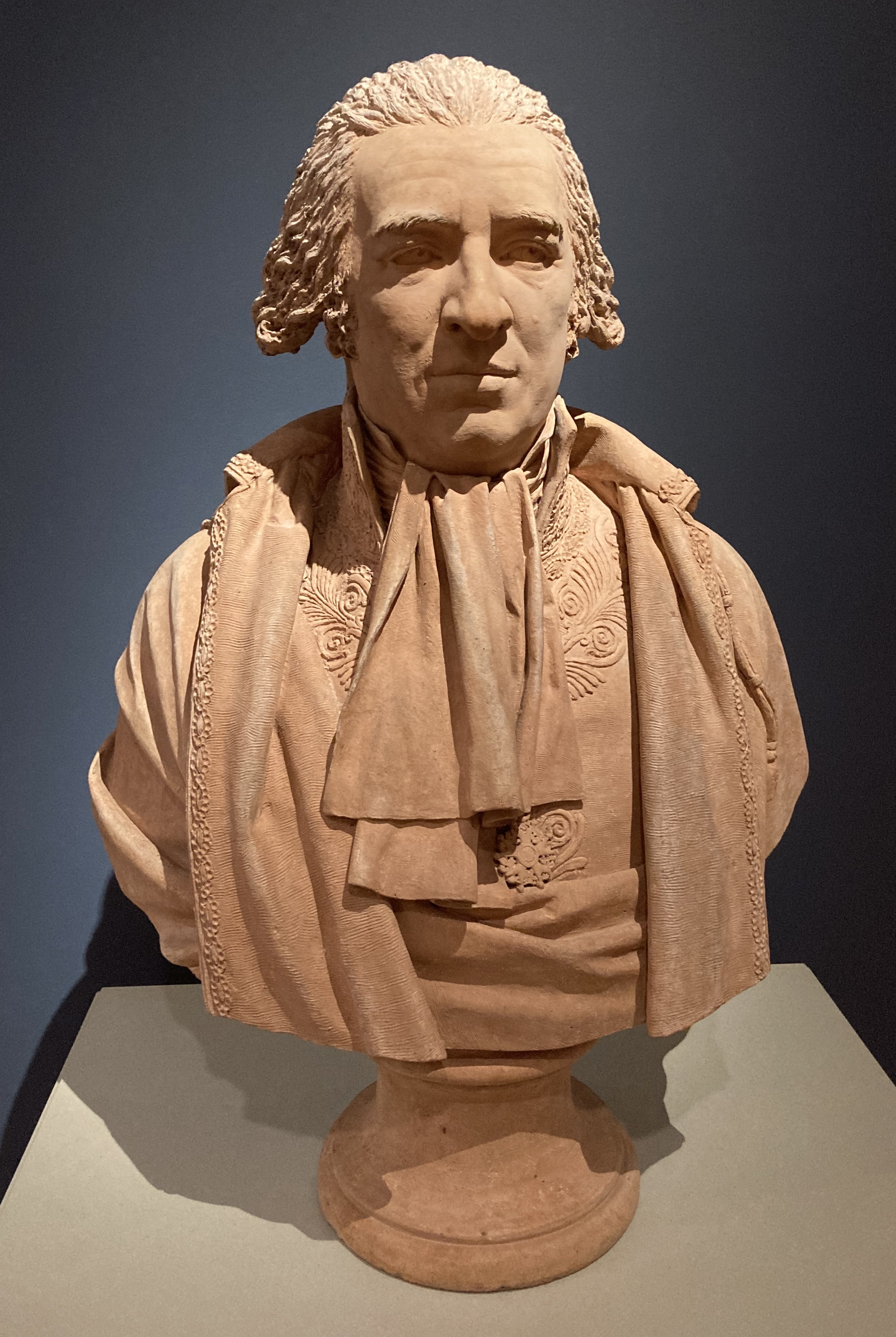
Bust of Antoine-Cesar de Choiseul-Praslin, the Duke of Praslin (1808)

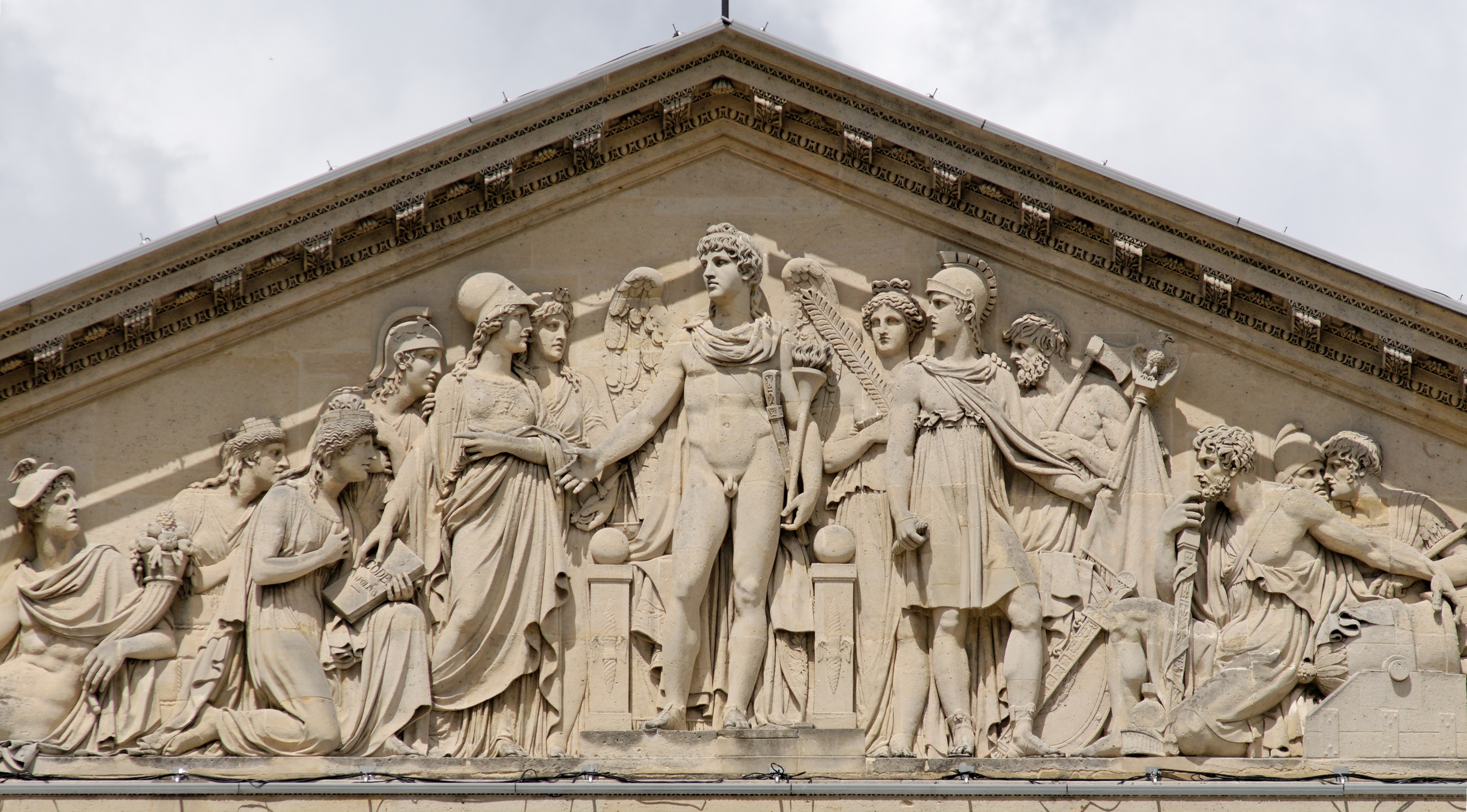
Pediment of the north façade of the Cour Carrée of the Louvre (1811)

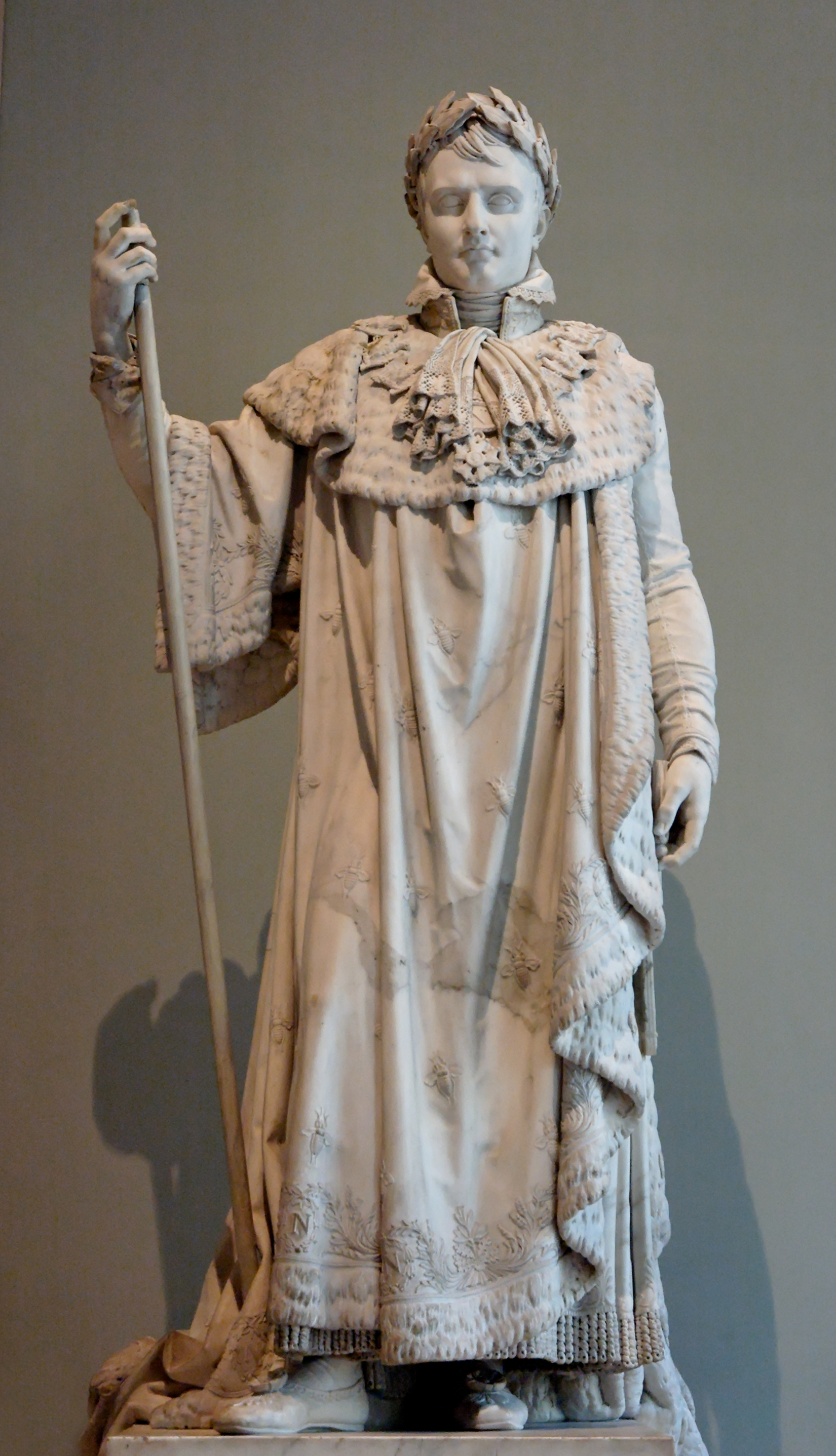
Napoleon I in coronation robes (1813)
