= 1801 in art =

Events in the year 1801 in Art.

== Events ==
- 27 April – The Royal Academy Exhibition of 1801 opens at Somerset House in London

== Works ==
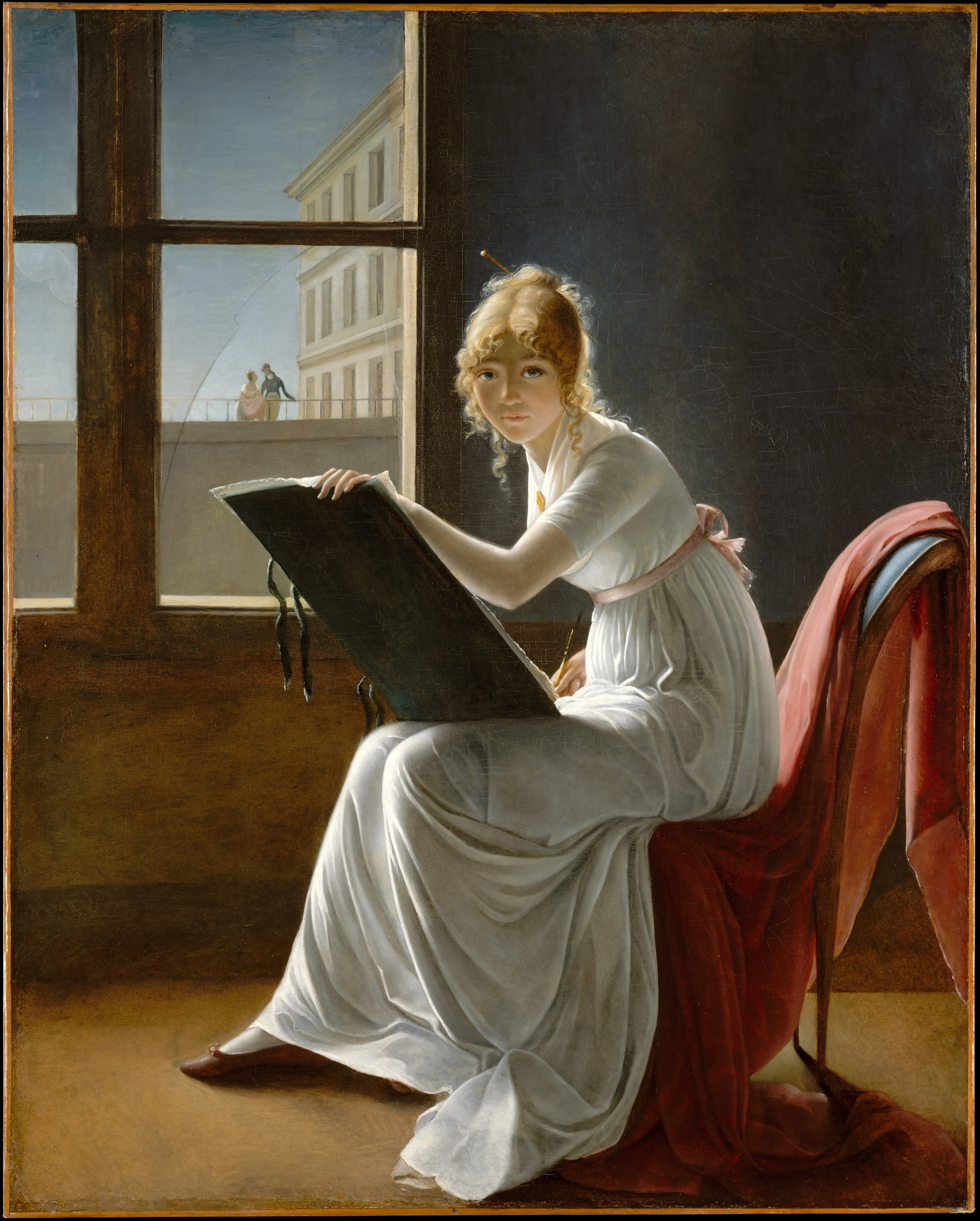
Marie-Denise Villers, Portrait of Charlotte du Val d'Ognes, 1801, Metropolitan Museum of Art, New York City

- Fyodor Alekseyev – Red Square in Moscow
- William Beechey
  - Portrait of John Boydell
  - Portrait of Horatio Nelson
- Jean Broc – The Death of Hyacinthos
- John Constable – Old Hall, East Bergholt
- John Singleton Copley – Colonel William Fitch and His Sisters
- Jacques-Louis David – Napoleon Crossing the Alps (first version)
- John Flaxman – Marble memorial to William Jones in chapel of University College, Oxford
- François Gérard – Portrait of Empress Josephine
- Anne-Louis Girodet de Roussy-Trioson – Ossian receiving the Ghosts of the French Heroes (Apothéose des héros français morts pour la patrie pendant la guerre de la liberté) (approx. date)
- Francisco Goya
  - Charles IV of Spain and His Family
  - Portrait of Manuel Godoy
- Thomas Lawrence
  - John Philip Kemble as Hamlet
  - Portrait of Caroline, Princess of Wales and Princess Charlotte
- Robert Lefèvre – Portrait of Pierre-Narcisse Guérin
- Louis-François Lejeune – The Battle of Marengo
- Philip James de Loutherbourg – Coalbrookdale by Night
- Constance Mayer - Self-Portrait of the Artist with her Father
- Rembrandt Peale – Rubens Peale with a Geranium
- J. M. W. Turner – Dutch Boats in a Gale
- Marie-Denise Villers – Young Woman Drawing
- Richard Westmacott – Marble memorial to John Yorke in parish church of St. Andrew, Wimpole, England

== Births ==
- January 4 – James Giles, Scottish landscape painter (died 1870)
- January 26 – John Quidor, American painter (died 1881)
- February 1 – Thomas Cole, American painter (died 1848)
- April 14 – Fedor Solntsev, Russian painter and art historian (died 1892)
- April 30 – André Giroux, French painter and photographer (died 1879)
- July 26 – Maria Röhl, Swedish painter (died 1875)
- September 4 – Alfred d'Orsay, French painter, sculptor and patron of the arts (died 1852)
- date unknown
  - Dai Xi, Chinese painter of the 19th century and representative of the academic manner (died 1860)
  - Fei Danxu, Chinese painter in Qing Dynasty (died 1850)
  - Robert Richard Scanlan, Irish painter and portraitist (died 1876)
  - Alexey Tyranov, Russian painter (died 1859)
- probable (born 1801/1804) – Paul Gavarni, French caricaturist (died 1866)

== Deaths ==
- January 30 - Giuseppe Ceracchi, Italian sculptor (born 1751)
- February 7 – Daniel Chodowiecki, Polish-born painter (born 1726)
- March 3 – Michael Angelo Rooker, English oil and watercolour painter, illustrator and engraver (born 1746)
- April 7 – Jacobus Buys, Dutch painter and engraver (born 1724)
- May 29 – Jan Bulthuis, Dutch draftsman and painter (born 1750)
- June 28
  - Martin Johann Schmidt, Austrian Rococo painter (born 1718)
  - Francis Wheatley, English portrait and landscape painter (born 1747)
- June 30 – Giuseppe Ceracchi, Italian-born portrait sculpture and republican, guillotined in France (born 1751)
- August 16 – Ralph Earl, American historical and portrait painter (born 1751)
- September 6 - William Tyler, English sculptor and architect, co-founder of the Royal Academy of Arts (born 1728)
- October 11 – John Donaldson, Scottish-born miniature painter in enamel and watercolour (born 1737)
- November 14 – Sigmund Freudenberger, Swiss painter (born 1745)
- December 2 – William Hamilton, English historical and decorative painter (born 1751)
- date unknown
  - Filippo Pennino, Italian sculptor (born 1755)
