= Royal Academy Exhibition of 1801 =

1801 art exhibition in London

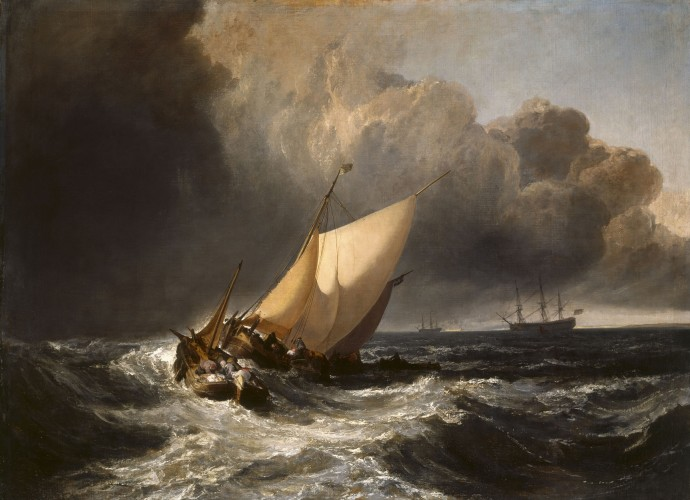
Dutch Boats in a Gale by J. M. W. Turner

The Royal Academy Exhibition of 1801 was the thirty third annual Summer Exhibition of the British Royal Academy of Arts, held at Somerset House in London from 27 April to 13 June 1801. It featured more than a thousand works by leading artists and architects of the period and attracted nearly fifty thousand visitors.

The French-born artist Philip James de Loutherbourg exhibited Coalbrookdale by Night, a romantic landscape painting inspired by the Industrial Revolution. He also exhibited pendant paintings of Conway Castle and Harlech Castle in Wales. J. M. W. Turner displayed the seascape Dutch Boats in a Gale, inspired by the works of Dutch seventeenth century Old Masters. In addition he produced the now lost biblical history painting The Army of the Medes Destroyed in the Desart by a Whirlwind. Thomas Lawrence submitted several of his elegant portrait paintings. His friend and rival Martin Archer Shee produced his Portrait of the Duke of Clarence, featuring the future William IV, and a portrait of the leading actor John Philip Kemble. William Beechey displayed his Portrait of Horatio Nelson featuring the celebrated Royal Navy admiral. Amongst other works William Hamilton submitted a scene featuring Musidora from James Thomson's The Seasons.

== Gallery ==
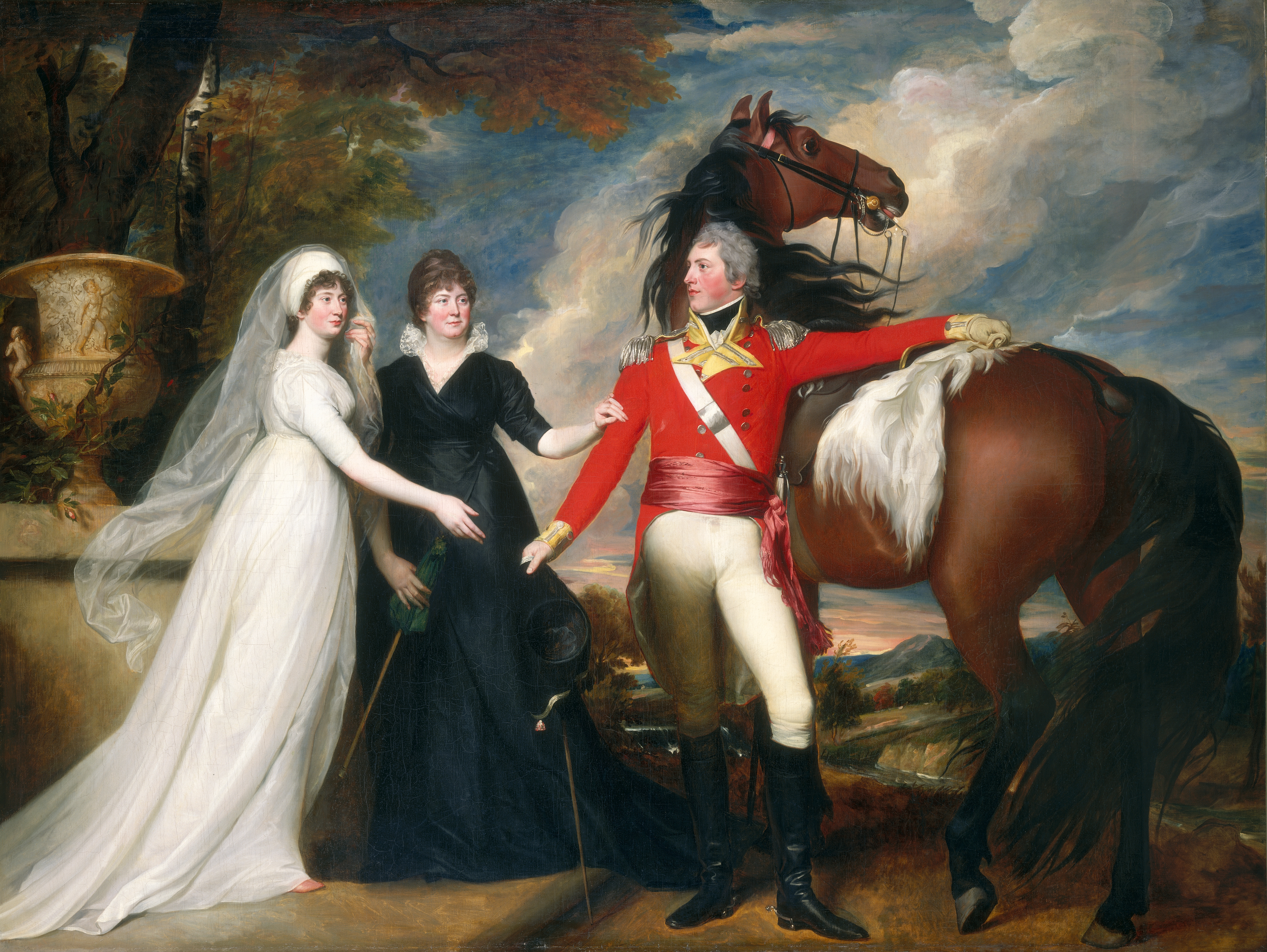
Colonel William Fitch and His Sisters by John Singleton Copley

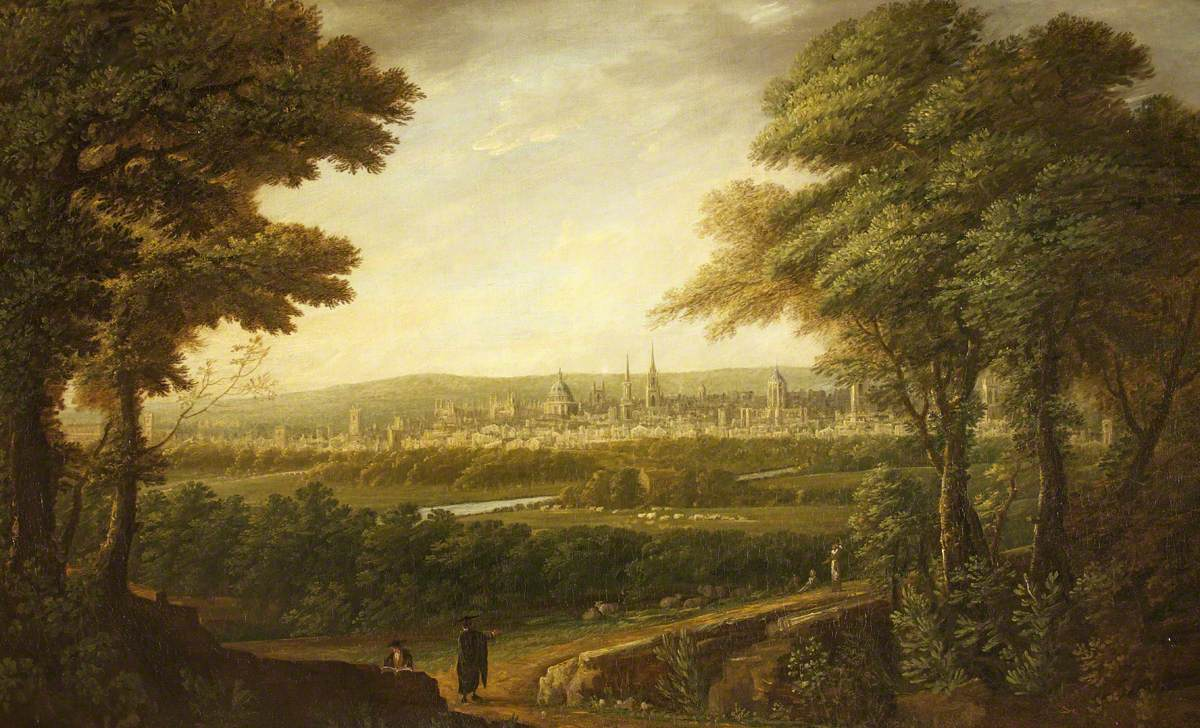
A View of Oxford by Augustus Wall Callcott

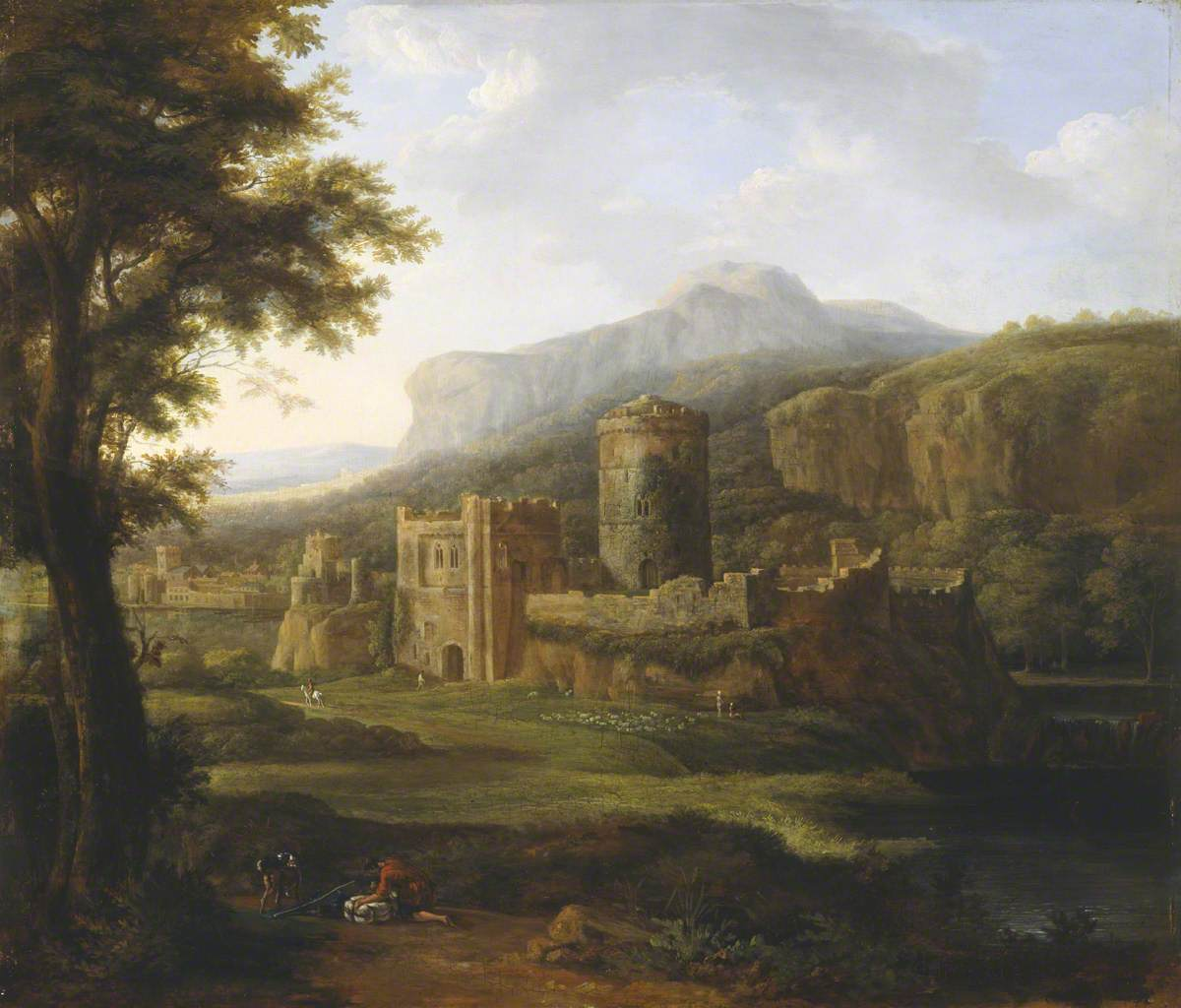
Pembroke Castle by Hendrik Frans de Cort

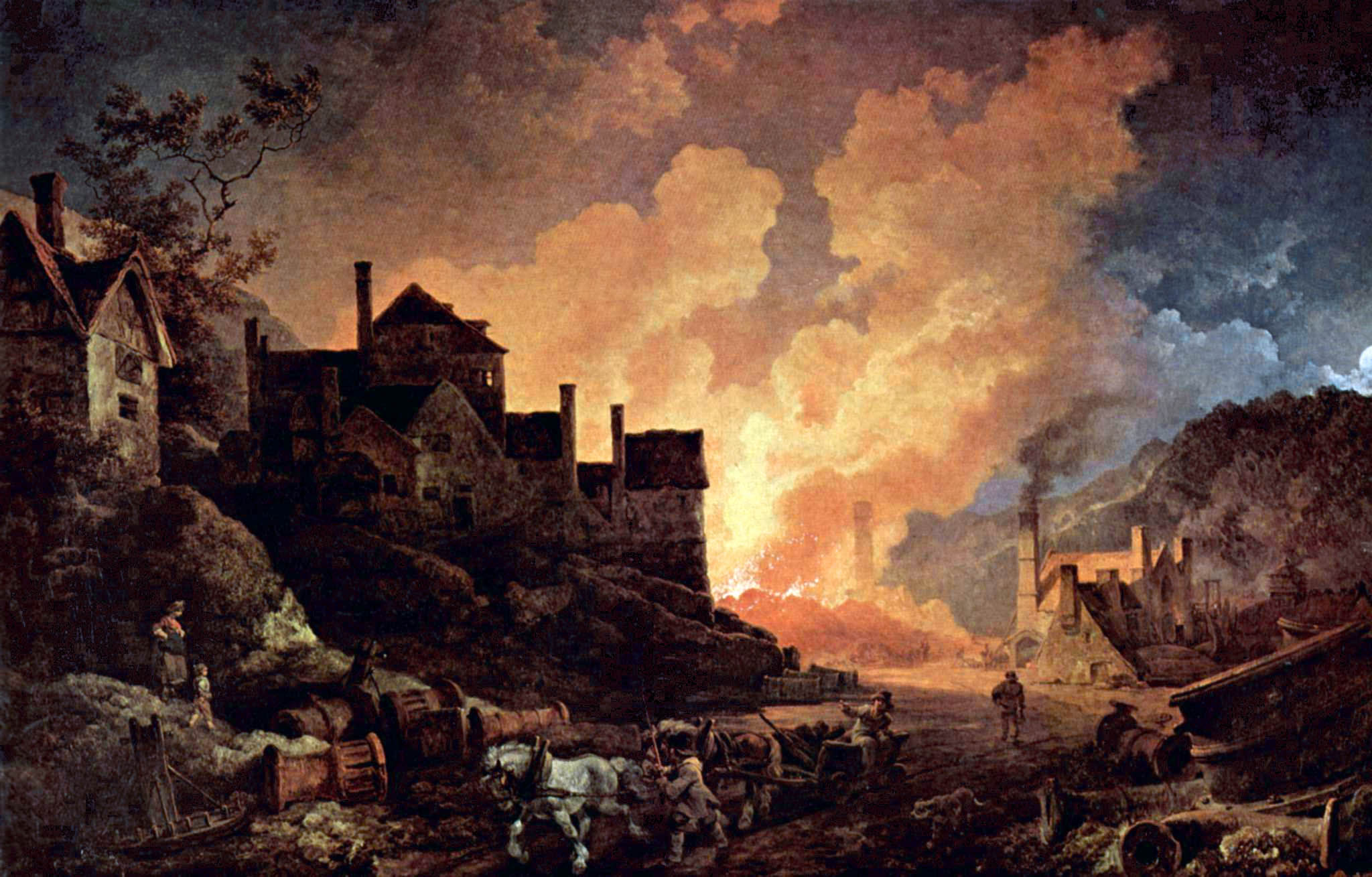
Coalbrookdale by Night by Philip James de Loutherbourg

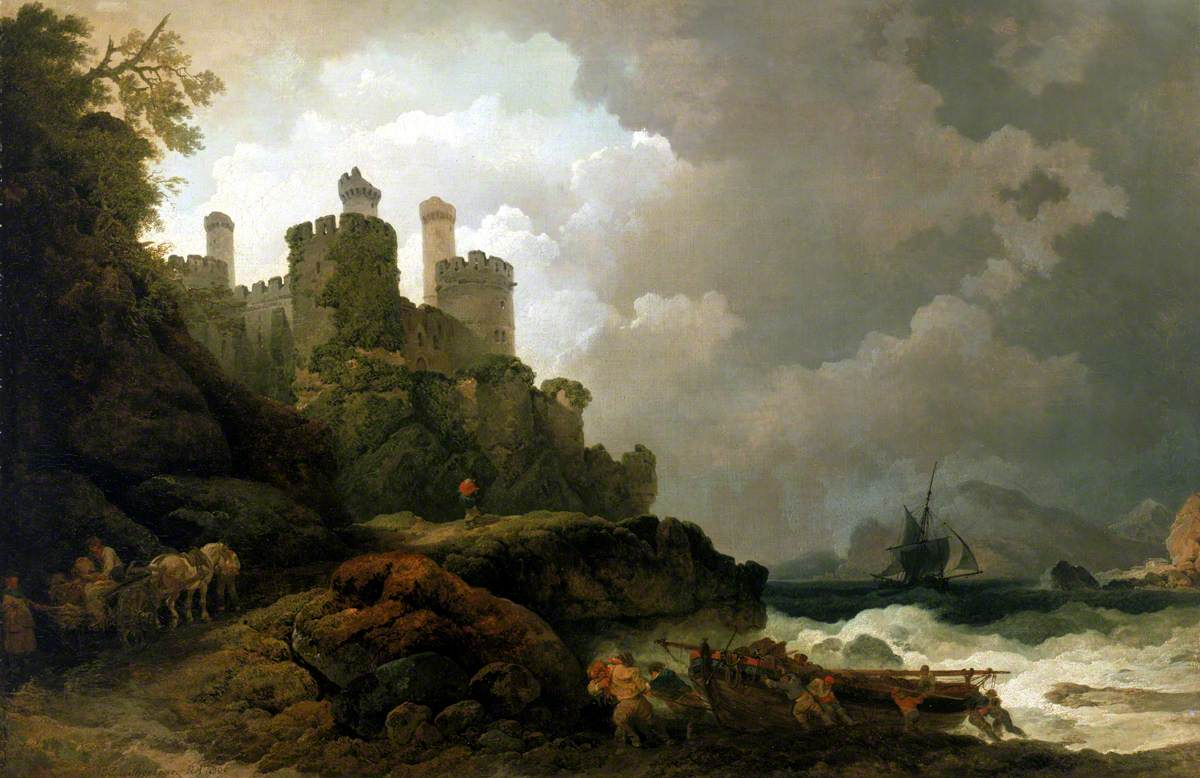
A Fishing Boat Brought Ashore near Conway Castle by Philip James de Loutherbourg

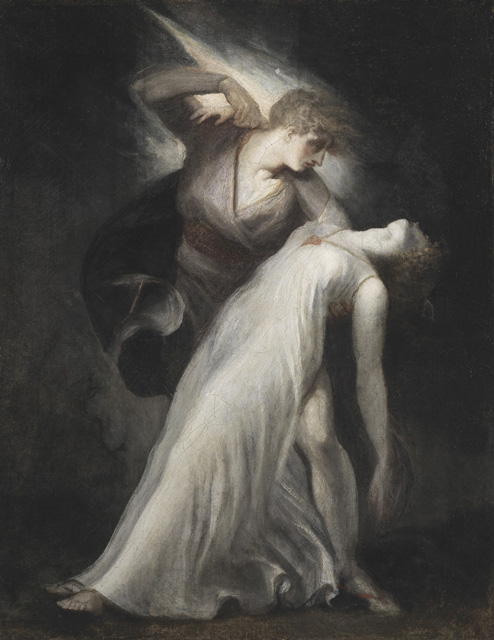
Celadon and Amelia by Henry Fuseli

The Anson Enganging Five Escaping French Frigates by Nicholas Pocock

Abarahm and Isaac by Benjamin West

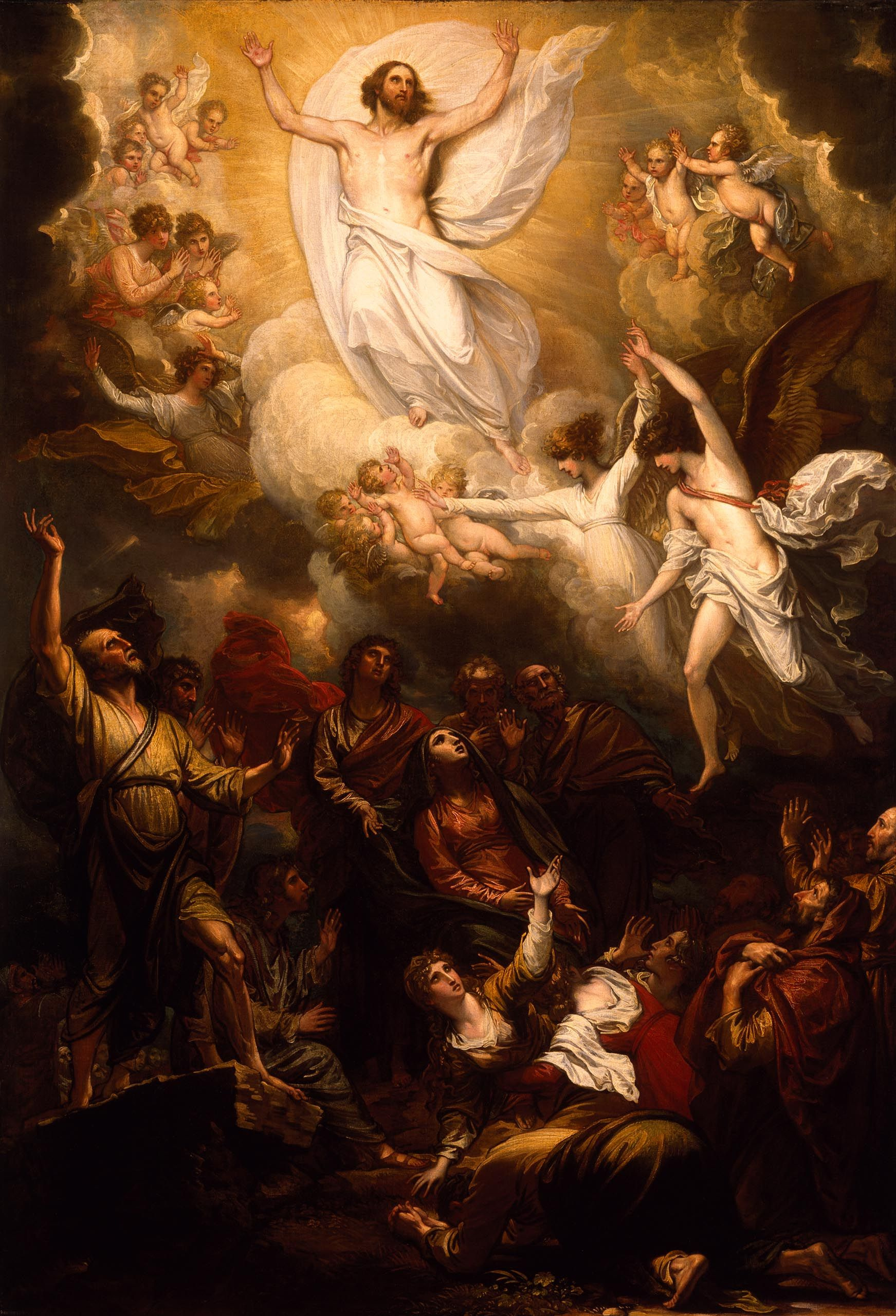
The Ascension by Benjamin West

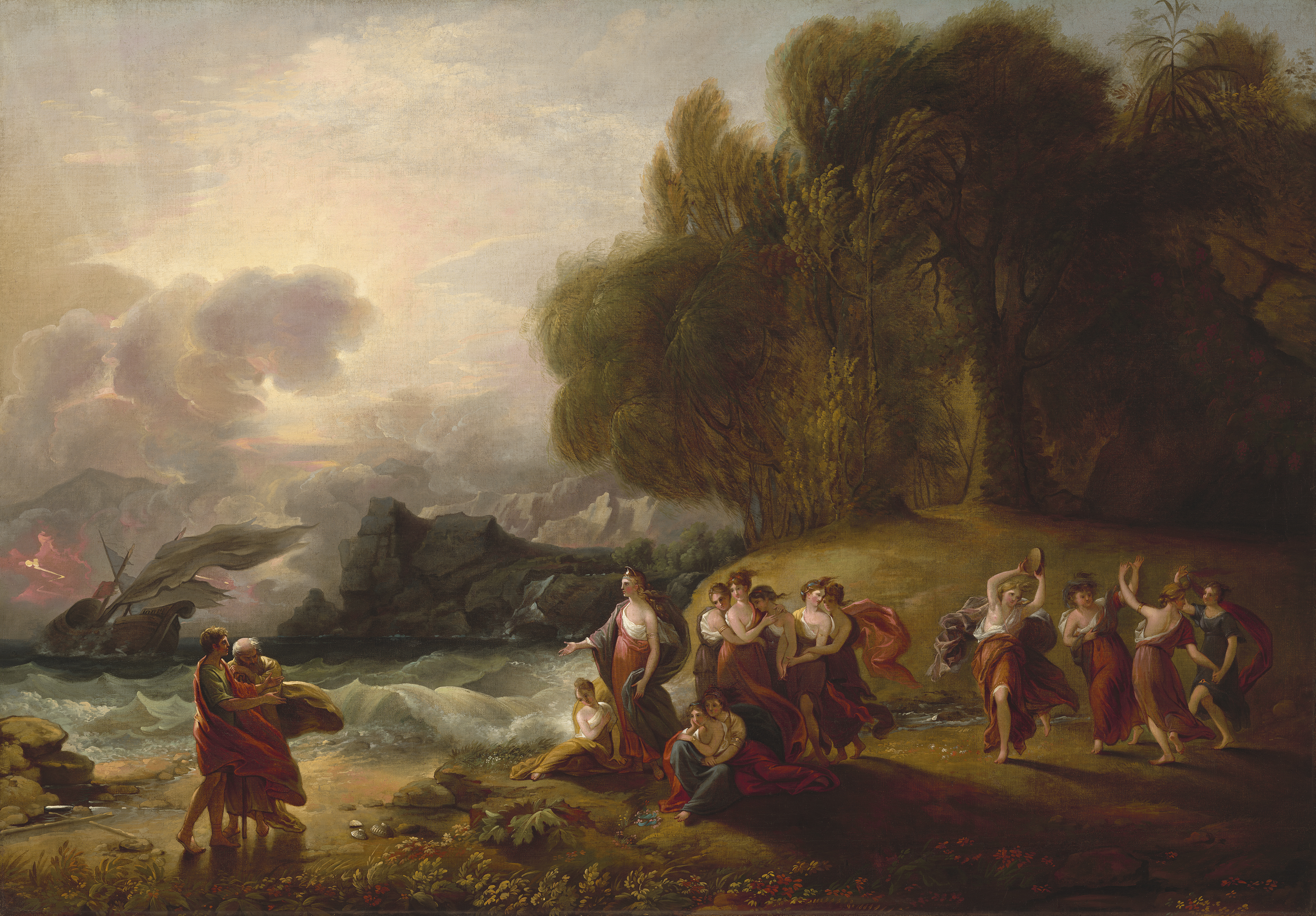
The First Interview of Telemachus with Calypso by Benjamin West

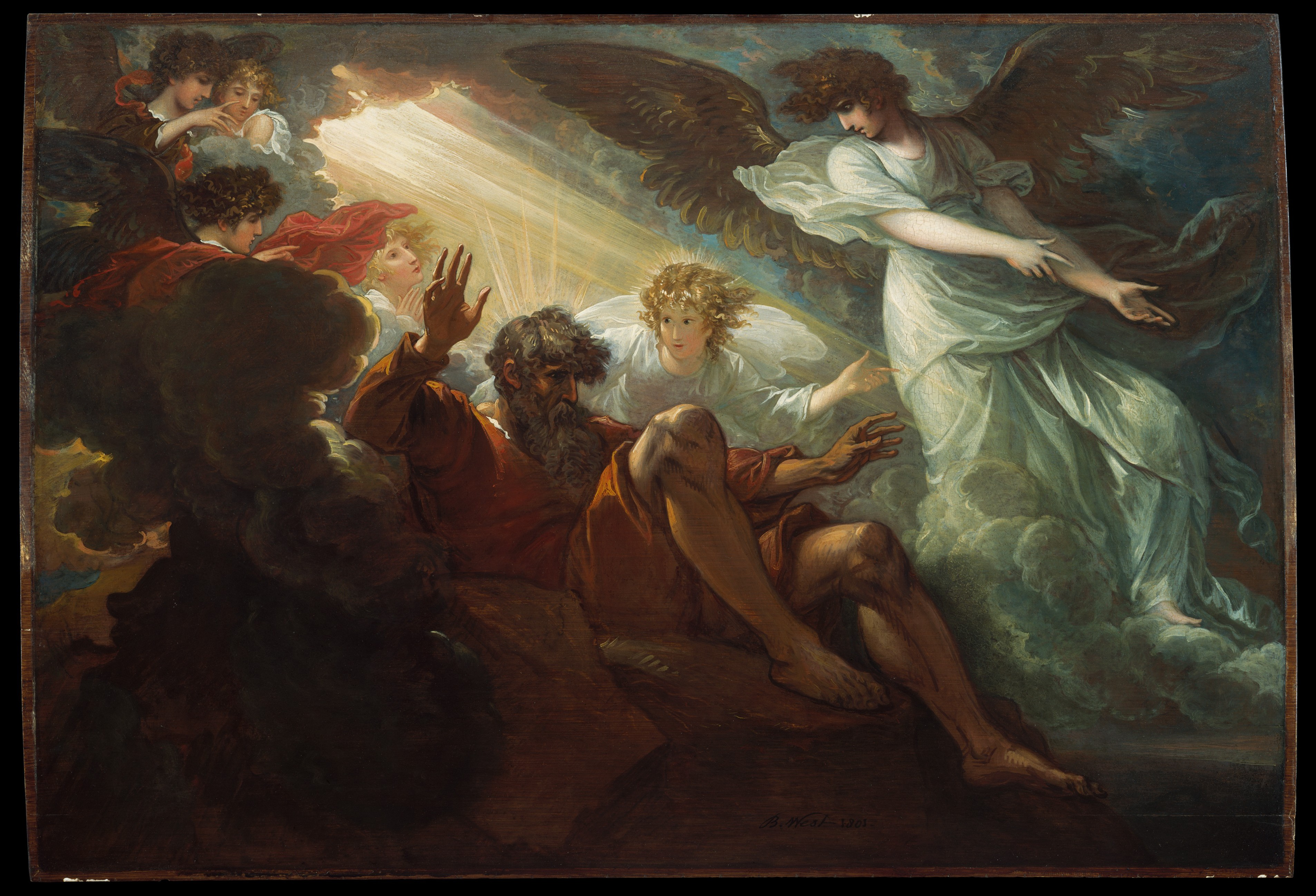
Moses Shown the Promised Land by Benjamin West

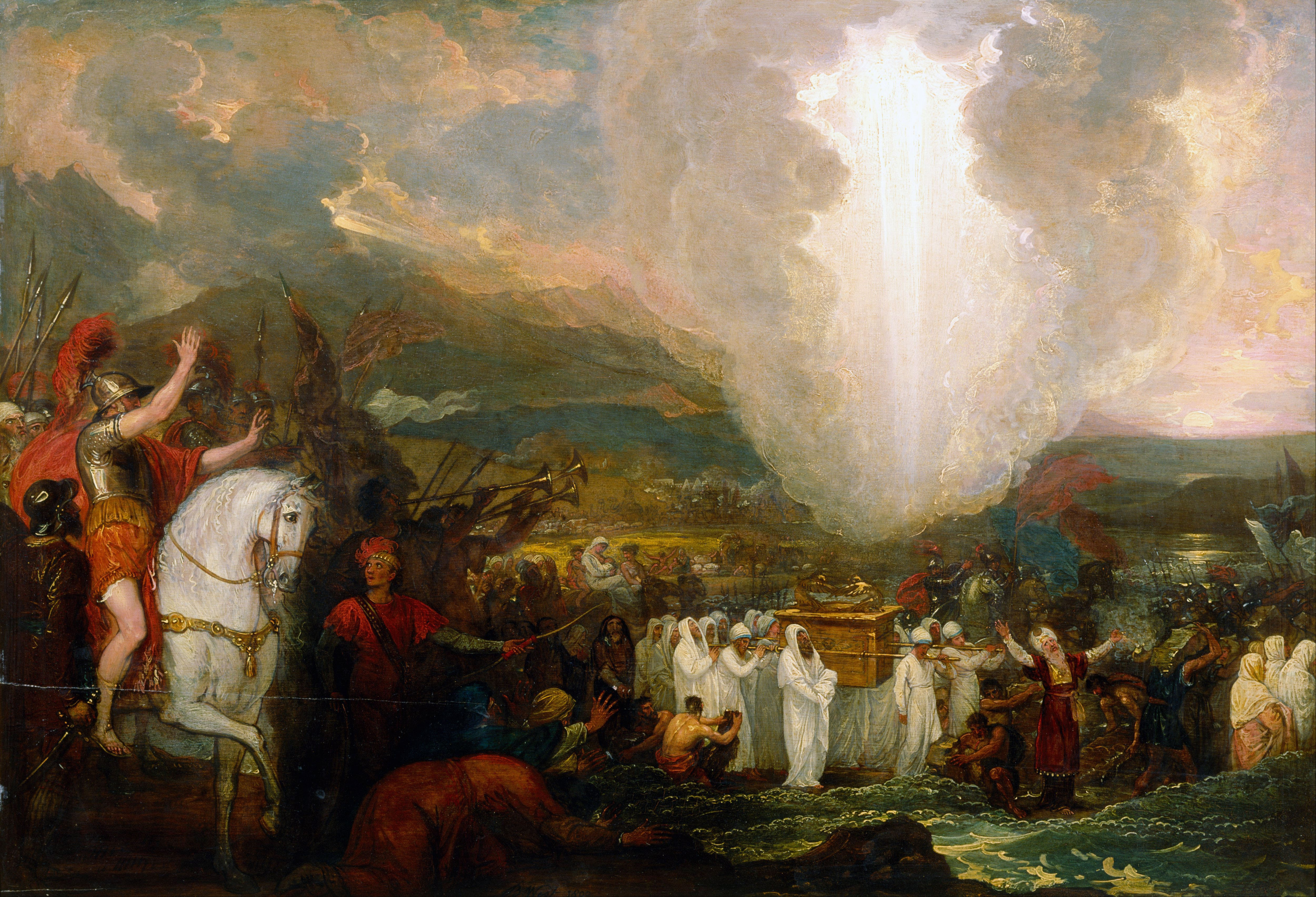
Joshua passing the River Jordan with the Ark of the Covenant by Benjamin West

Hannah Presenting Samuel to Eli by Benjamin West

London, Autumnal Morning by J. M. W. Turner

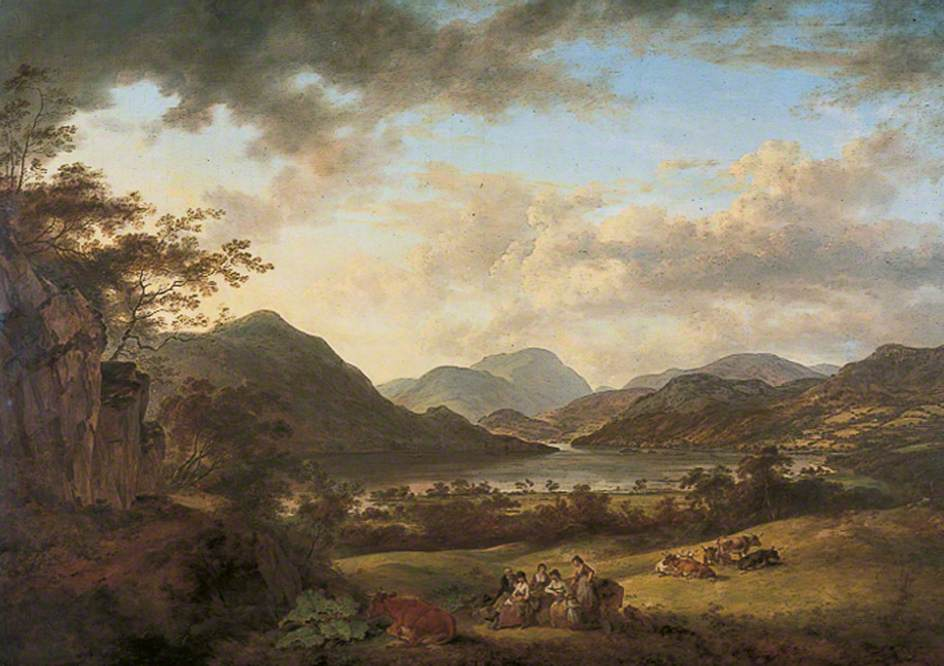
Ullswater from Gowbarrow, Cumbria by Julius Caesar Ibbetson

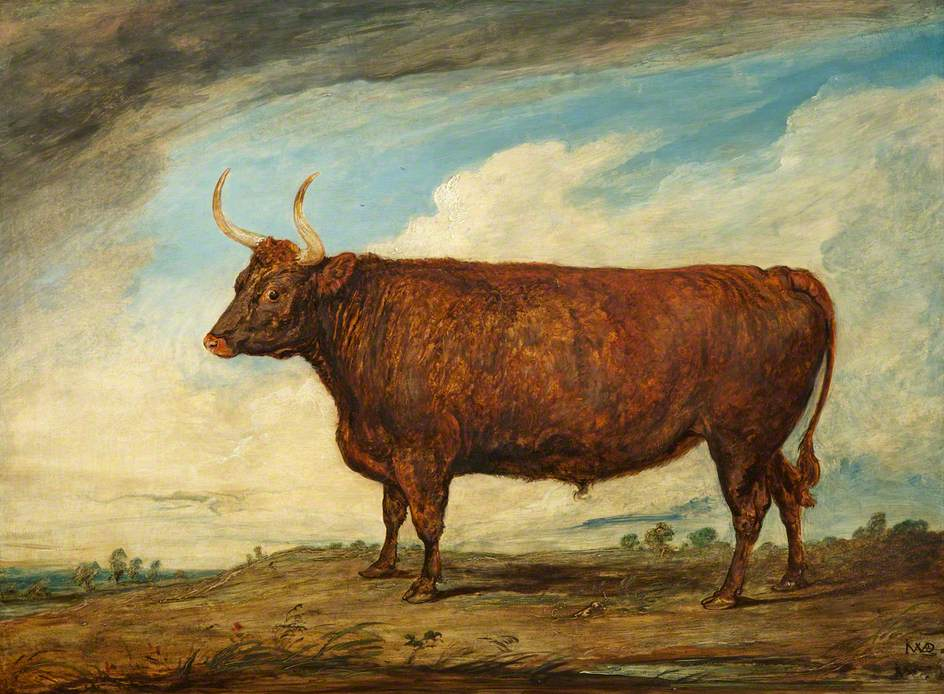
The Devonshire Ox by James Ward

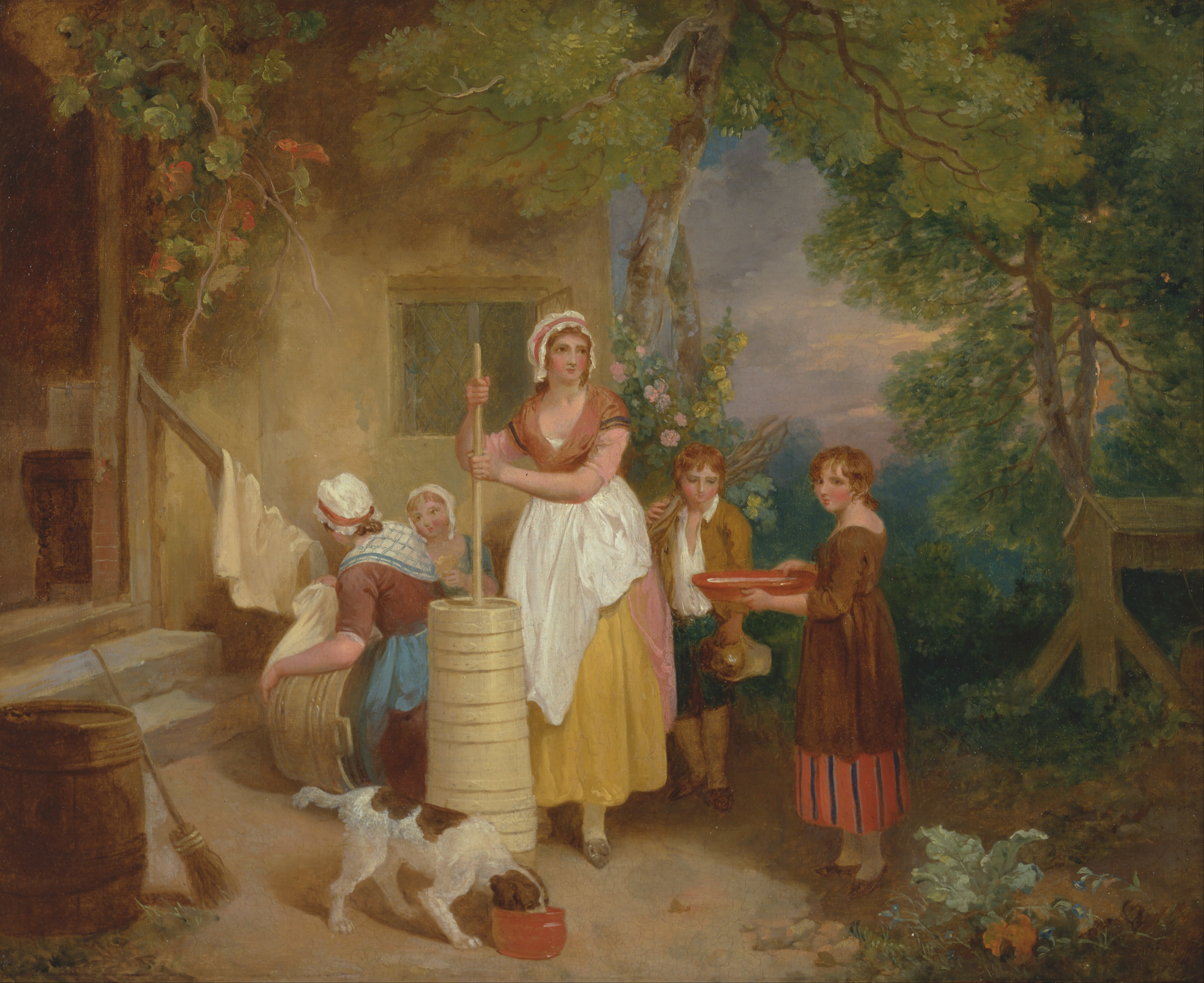
Morning by Francis Wheatley

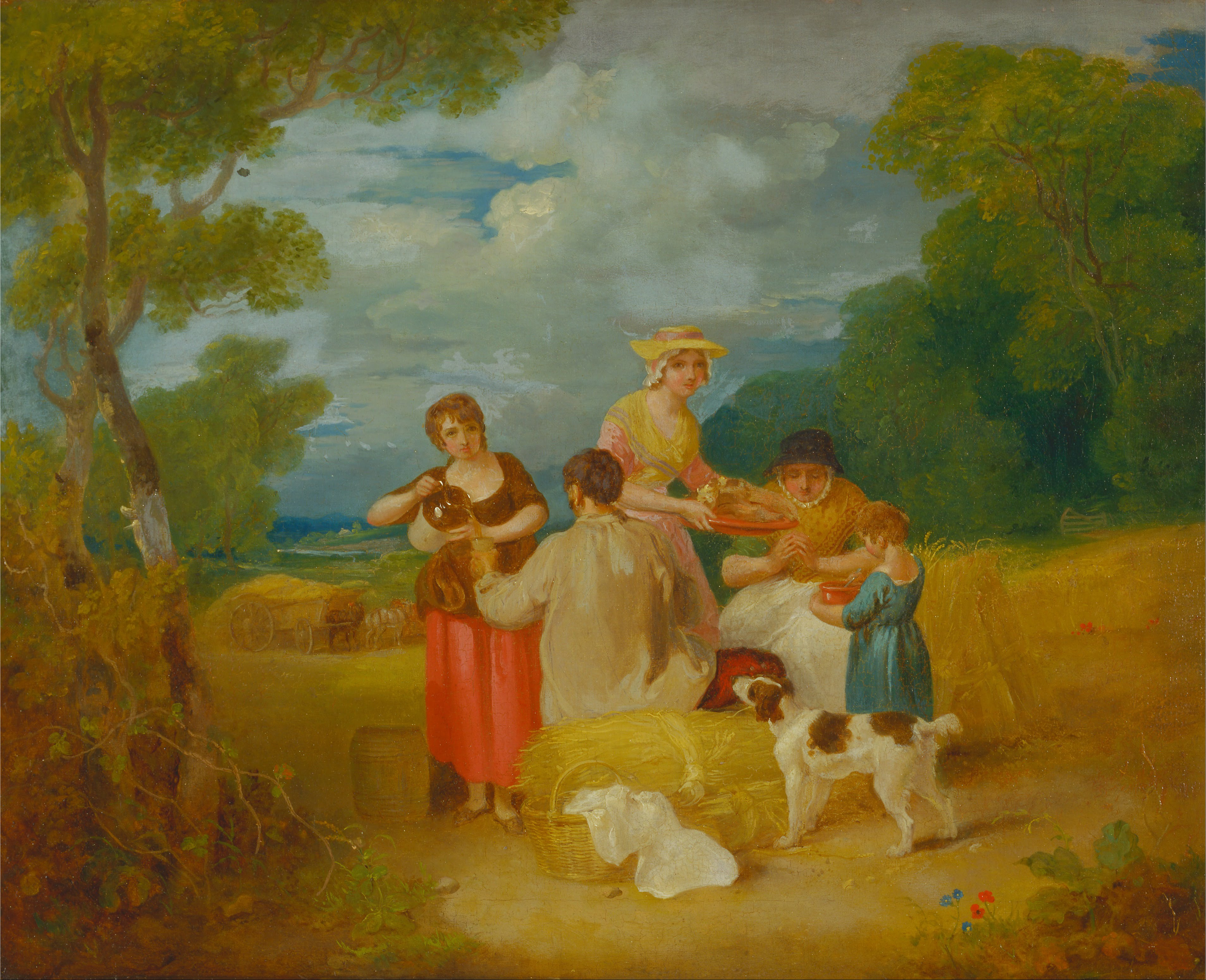
Noon by Francis Wheatley

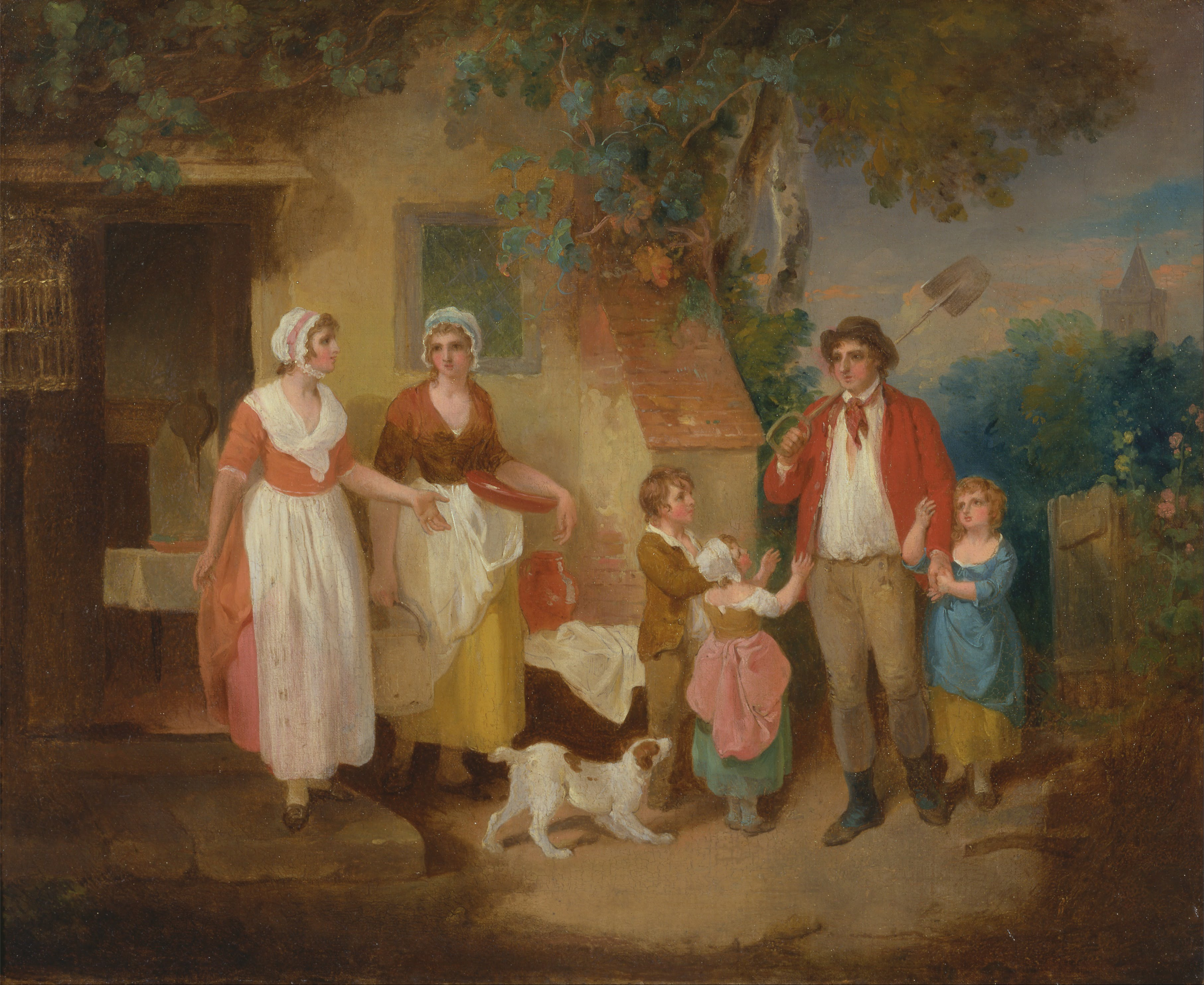
Evening by Francis Wheatley

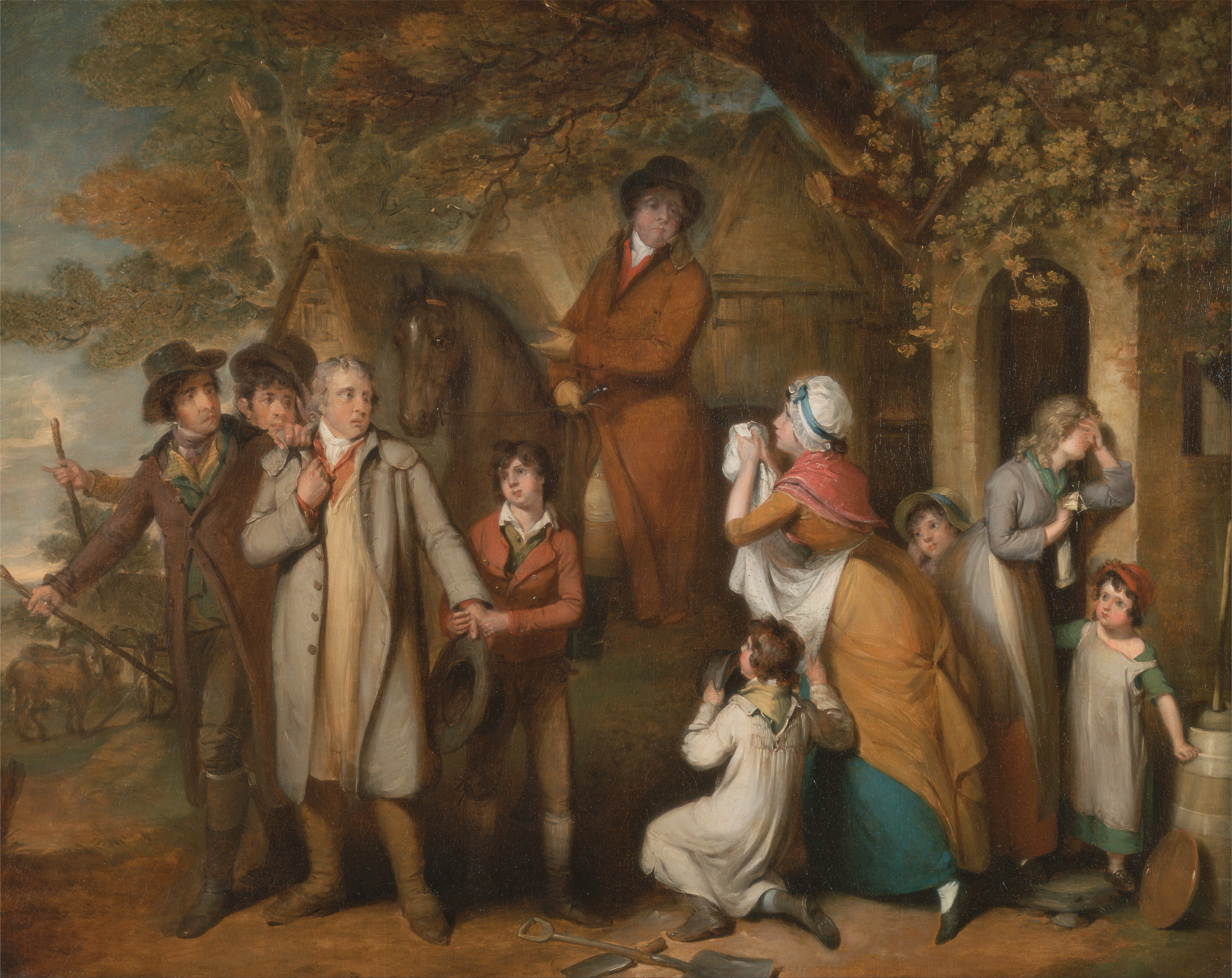
The Severe Steward by William Redmore Bigg

James Stuart by Thomas Lawrence

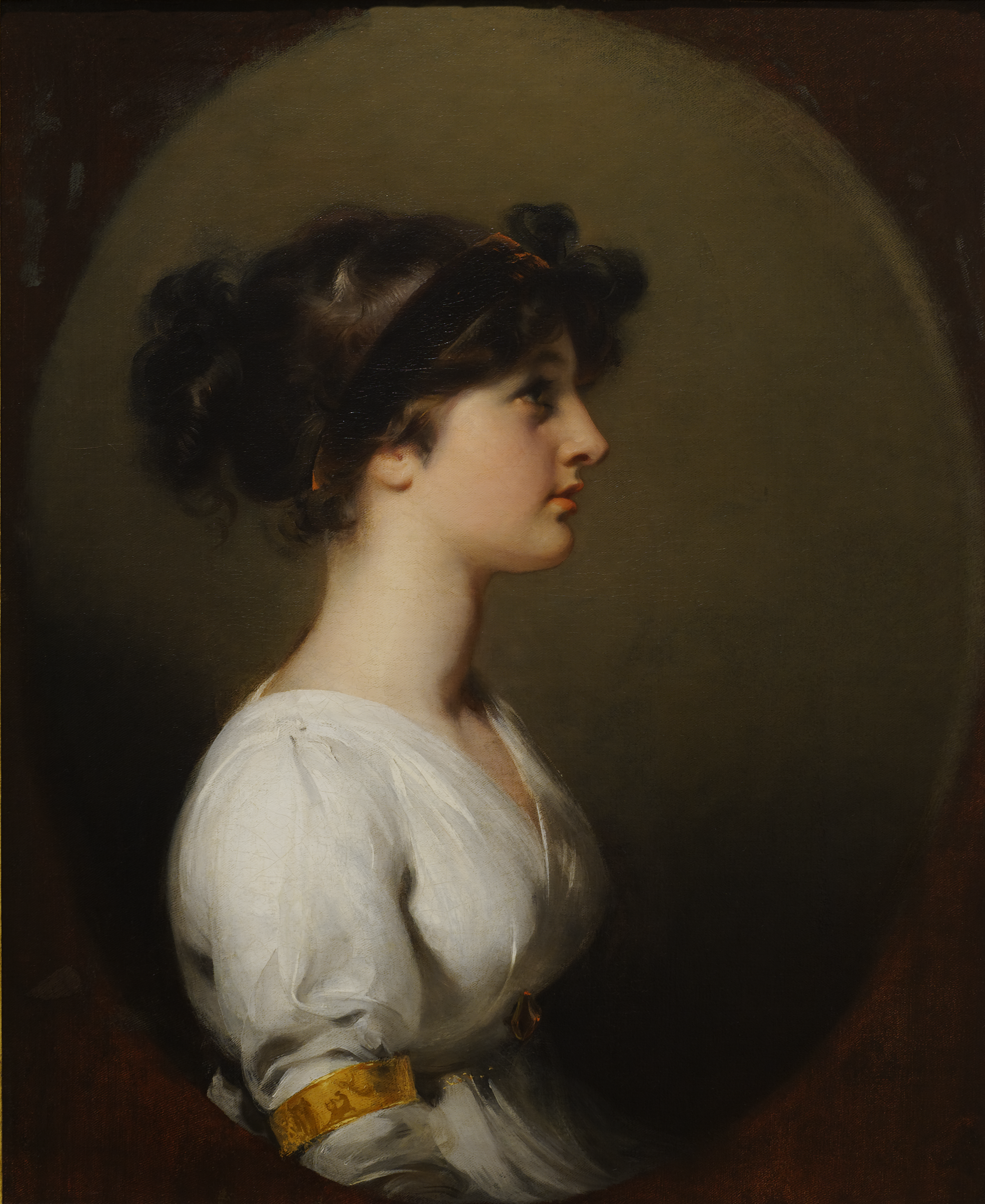
Caroline Upton by Thomas Lawrence

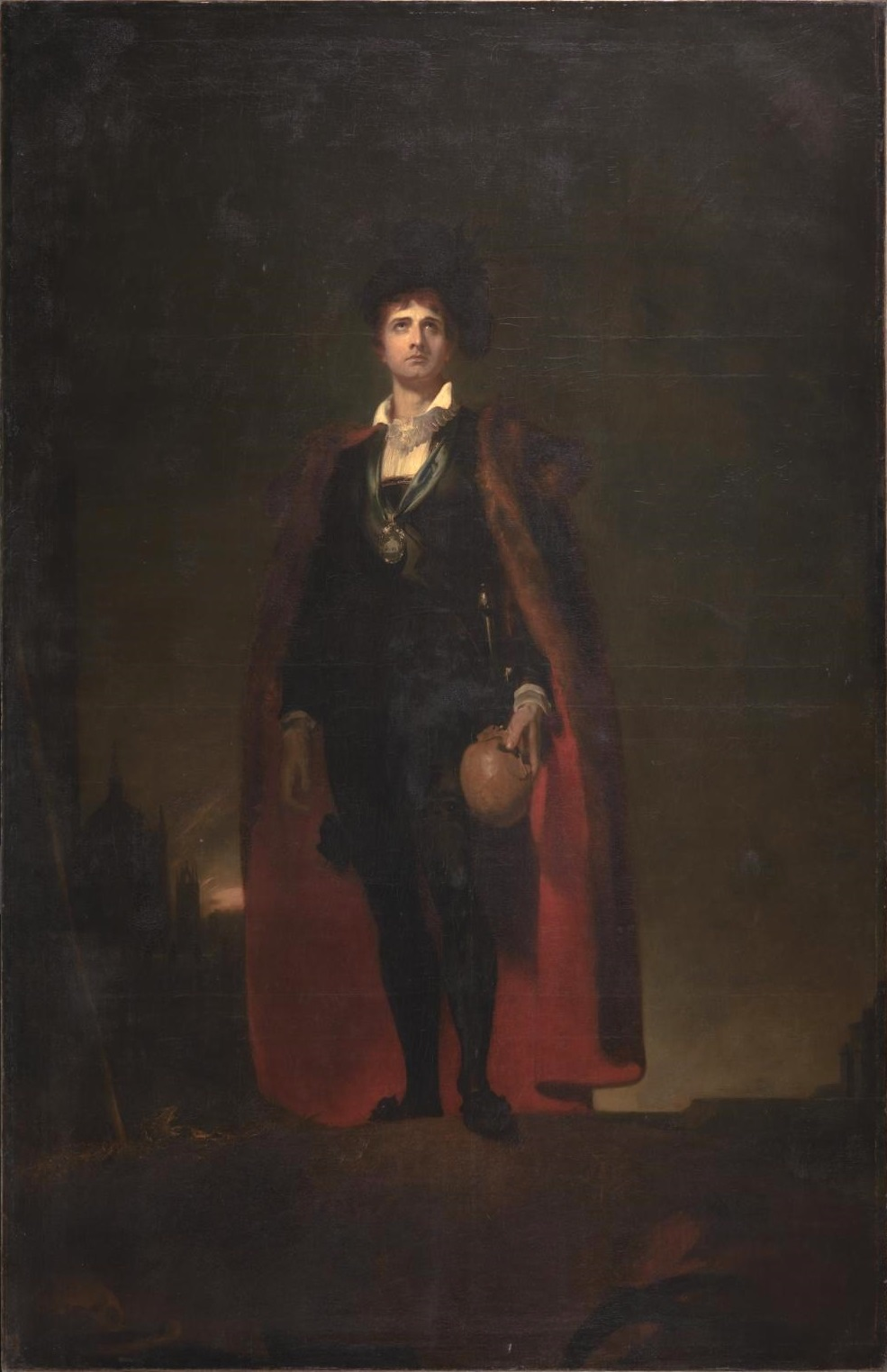
John Philip Kemble as Hamlet by Thomas Lawrence

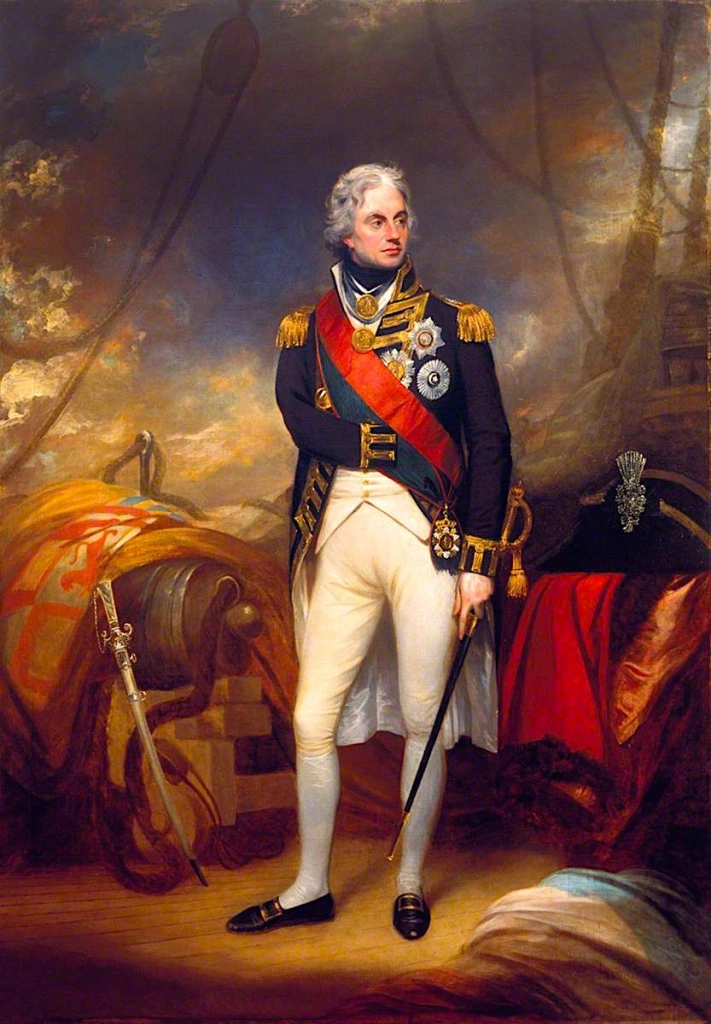
Portrait of Horatio Nelson by William Beechey

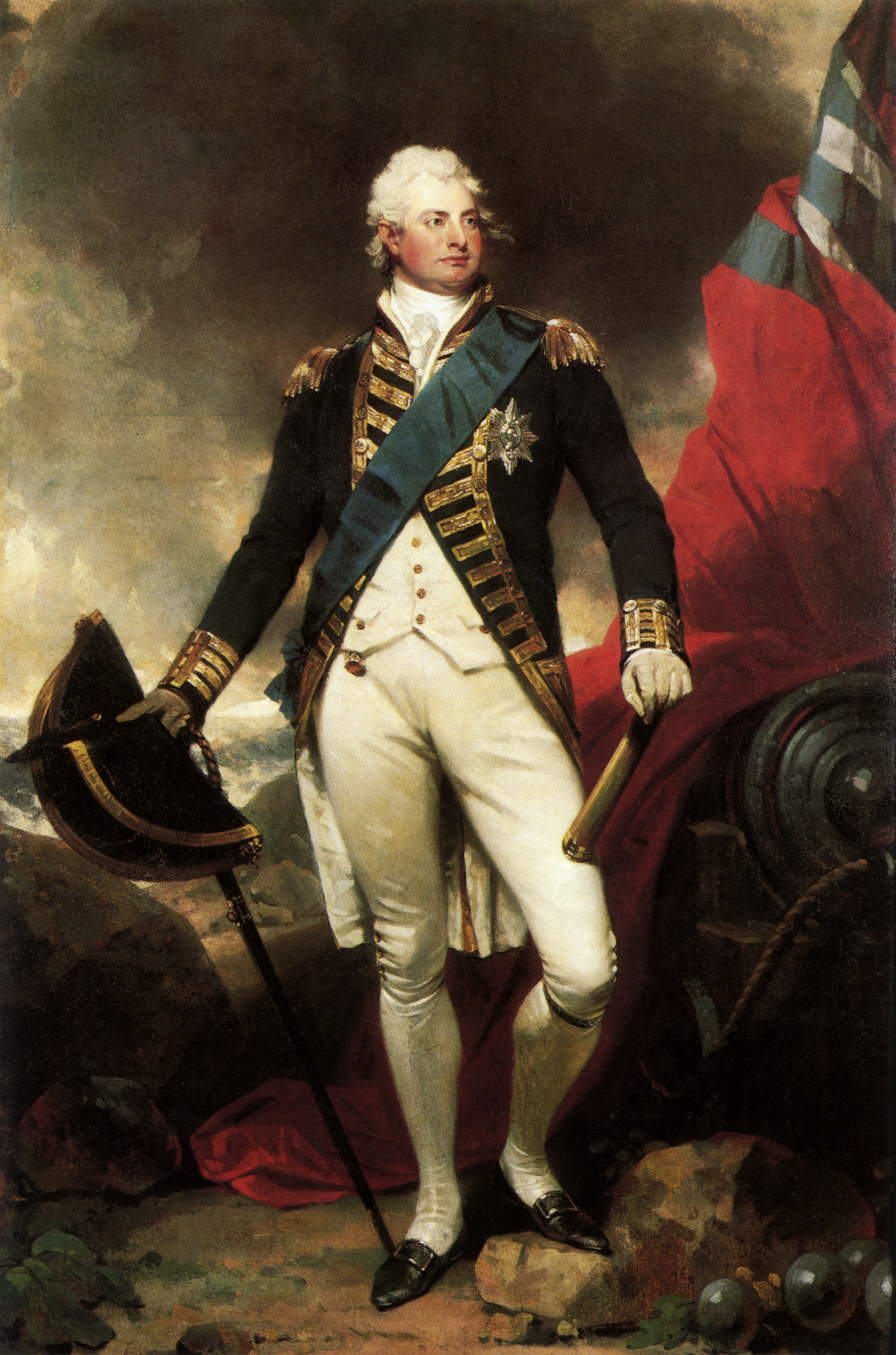
Portrait of the Duke of Clarence by Martin Archer Shee

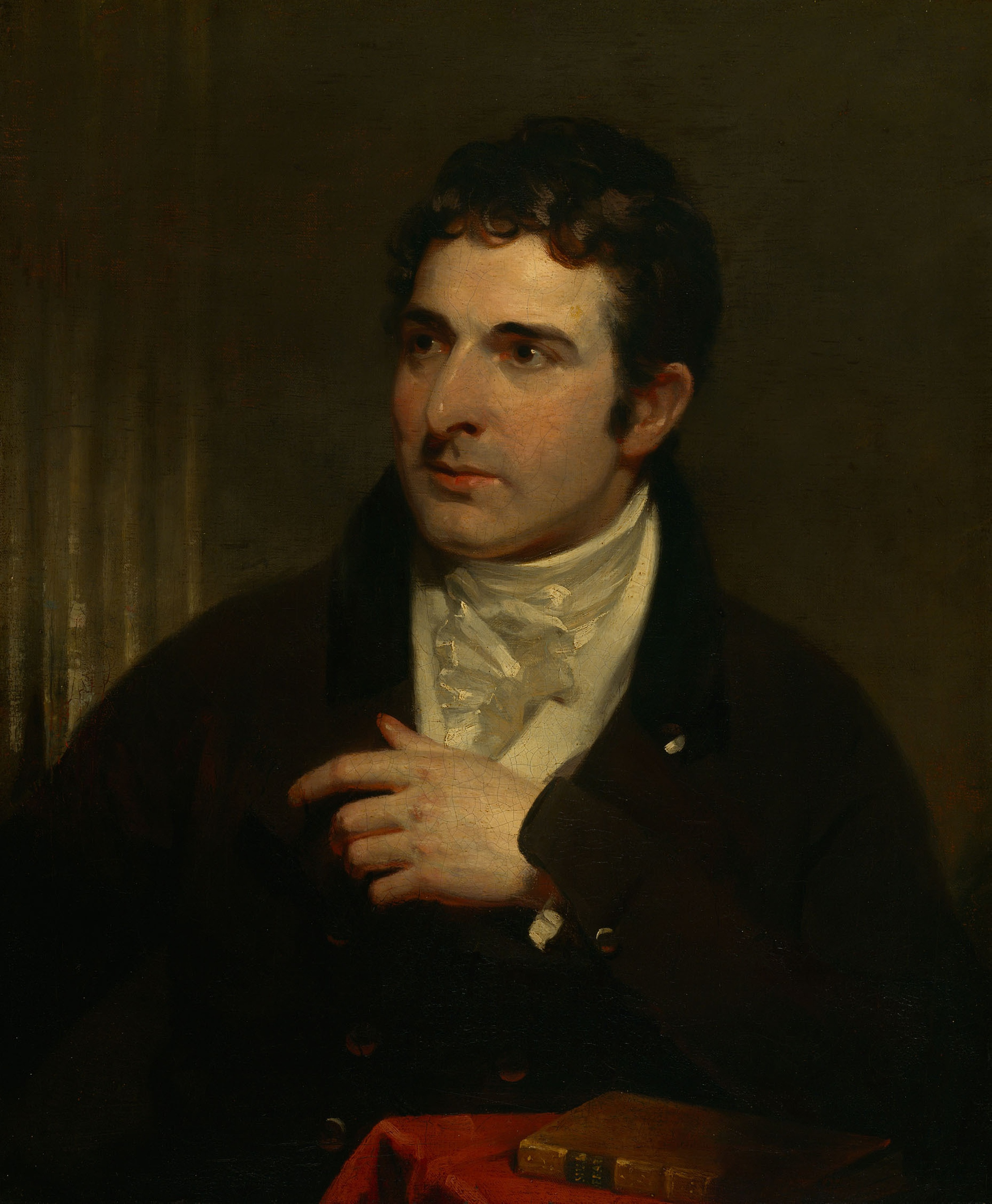
John Philip Kemble by Martin Archer Shee

Marquess Townshend by Mather Brown

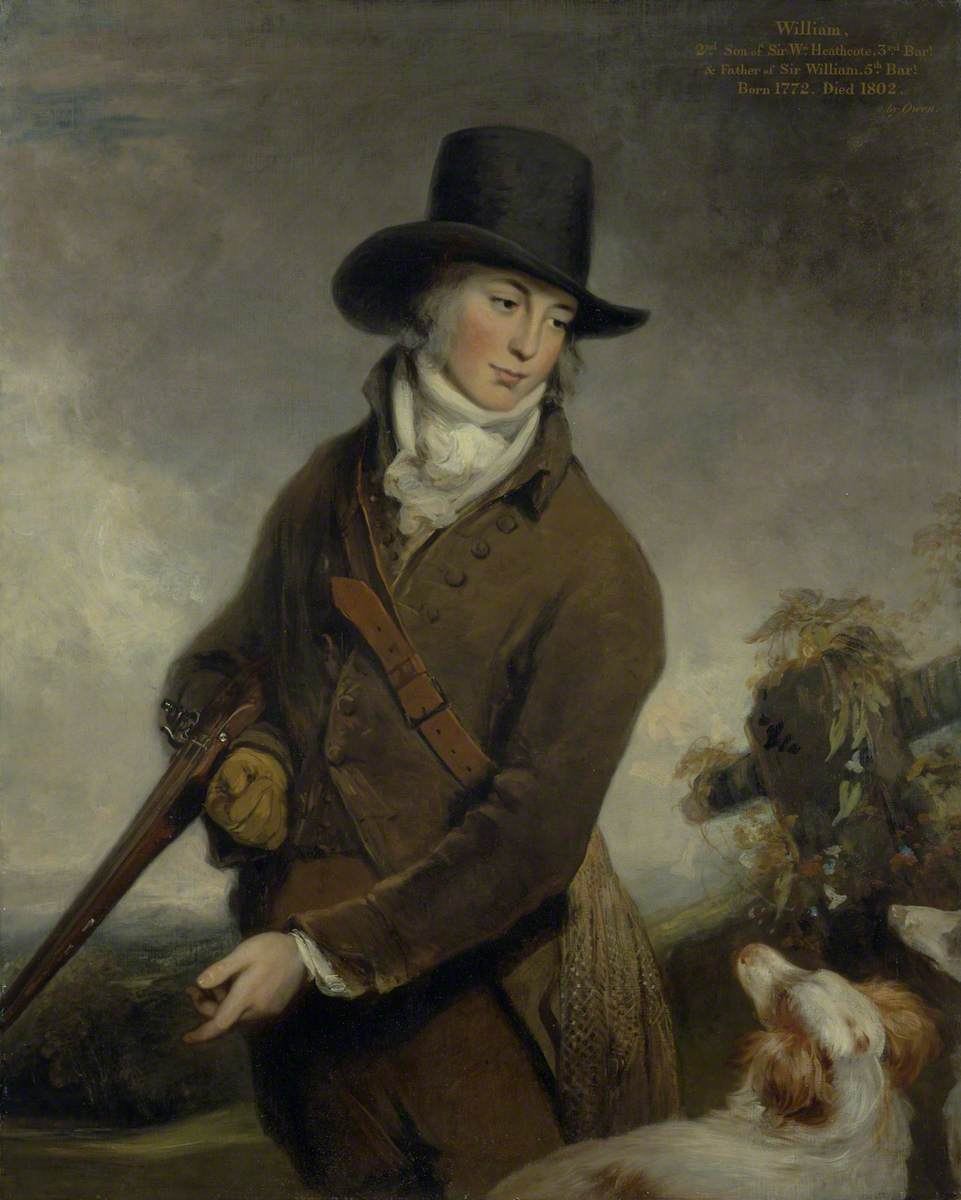
William Heathcote by William Owen

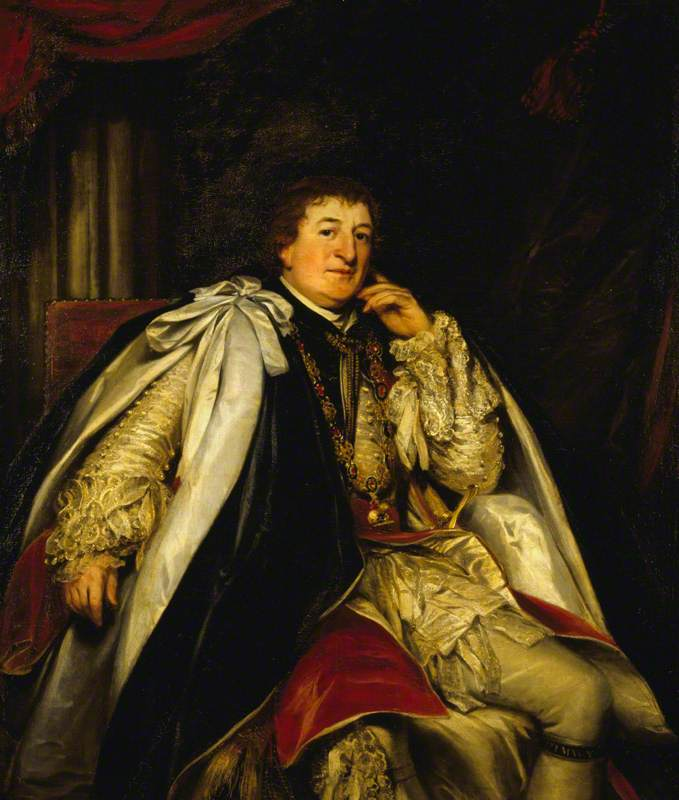
Duke of Northumberland by Thomas Phillips

John Herring by John Opie

== See also ==
- Salon of 1801, a French art exhibition held at the Louvre in Paris

== Bibliography ==
- Bailey, Anthony. J.M.W. Turner: Standing in the Sun. Tate Enterprises Ltd, 2013.
- Isham, Howard F. Image of the Sea: Oceanic Consciousness in the Romantic Century. Peter Lang, 2004.
- Levey, Michael. Sir Thomas Lawrence. Yale University Press, 2005.
- Murray, Christopher John. Encyclopedia of the Romantic Era, 1760-1850, Volume 2. Taylor & Francis, 2004.
- Spencer-Longhurst, Paul. The Sun Rising Through Vapour: Turner's Early Seascapes. Third Millennium Information, 2003.
