= William Bigg =

William Bigg may refer to:

- William Redmore Bigg (1755–1828), British painter
- William Bigg (High Sheriff of Berkshire), High Sheriff of Berkshire in 1656
- William Bygge, Mayor of Canterbury in 1461 and 1467
