= Robert Richard Scanlan =

Irish artist

- Born: 1801; Ireland
- Died: 1876 (aged 74–75)
- Known for: Portrait painting

Robert Richard Scanlan (1801–1876), sometimes known as R. R. Scanlan, was an Irish painter and portraitist who worked in oil and watercolour.

== Life ==
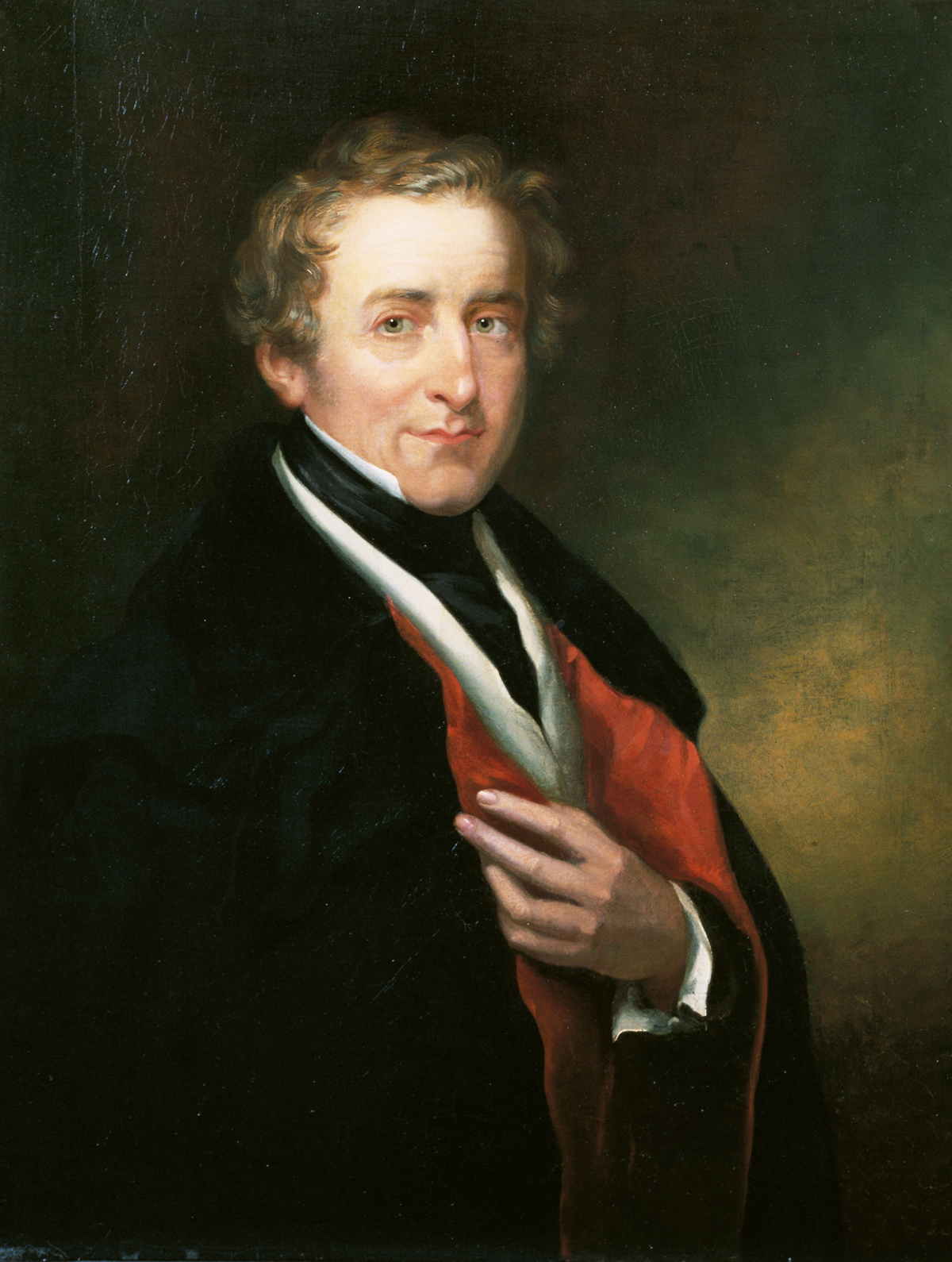
Sir Robert Peel by Robert Richard Scanlan

He attended the Royal Academy Schools, London from age 21. In 1826-27 he resided at 7 Burgh Quay, Dublin. He exhibited portraits at the Royal Hibernian Academy between 1826 and 1864.

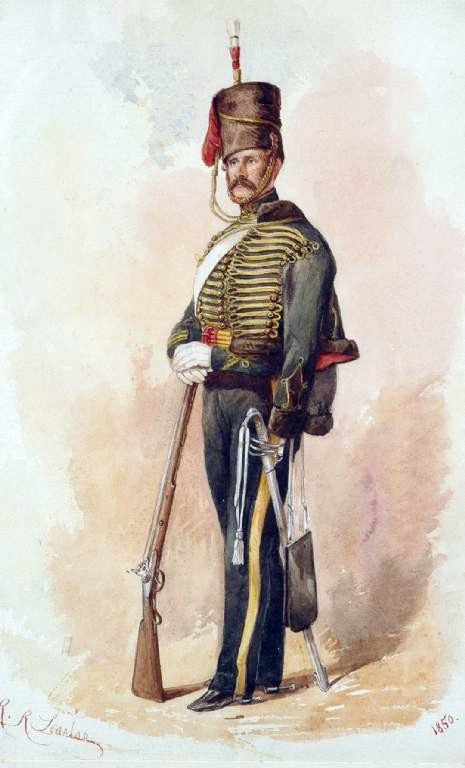
8th King's Royal Irish Hussars (1850) Robert Richard Scanlan

In lived in London for a time after the 1820s, living there until 1853 when he was appointed Master of the Cork School of Design. When the school temporarily closed in 1854, he returned to London. He exhibited at the Royal Academy from 1837 to 1859. He exhibited with other London institutions from 1832 to 1876, including the British Institution and the Society of Artists, and elsewhere such as the Royal Glasgow Institute. He also lived in Plymouth.

In 1828 a number of portraits by Scanlan of the Smith-Barry family were hung at the Mechanics' Institute in Cork. He also painted animals and domestic subjects in oils and watercolours. In 1849, coloured prints of military costumes were published by Lloyd Brother after his drawings. In 1859, his Donnybrook Fair was exhibited at the Belfast Fine Art Society.

In 1849, he appeared in a debtor's court for money owed to a carver and guilder, possibly for frames.He was described then as "struggled with poverty and sickness for some time".

A number of his other works were reproduced as aquatints, and lithographs. Two of his best known works were portraits of Prime Ministers, Sir Robert Peel and the Duke of Wellington. These were engraved by H. Cook. His portrait of Captain Surman, adjutant of the Gloucestershire Yeomanry, was reproduced in lithograph by Day and Son. J. Hackett of Exeter produced a series of 25 humorous lithographs by Scanlan as Barney Bryan's Sketch Book.

Scanlan often depicted people and vehicles in motion, as well as sports and recreation, including those of an equestrian nature. He painted portraits and watercolour portrait groups, described by Professor Anne Crookshank of Trinity College Dublin "as charmingly evocative of the leisured society of Victorian Ireland."
