= Dutch Boats in a Gale =

Painting by J. M. W. Turner

- The Bridgewater Seapiece, Dutch Boats in a Gale: Fishermen Endeavouring to Put Their Fish on Board (original name)
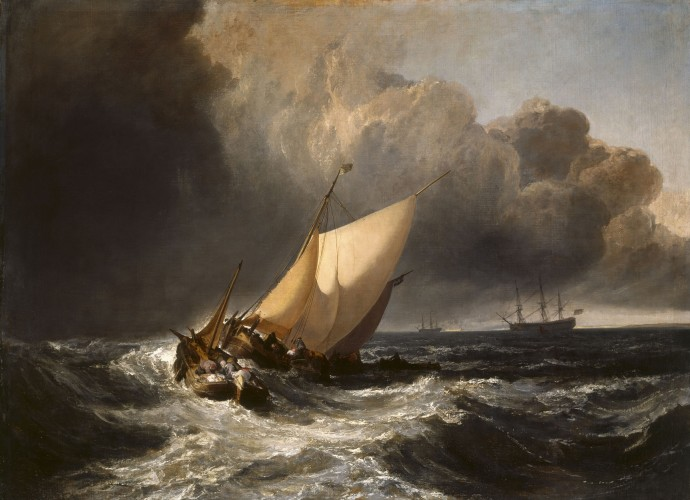
- Artist: J. M. W. Turner
- Year: 1801
- Type: Oil on canvas, seascape painting
- Dimensions: 163 cm × 221 cm (64 in × 87 in)
- Location: National Gallery, London
- Website: www.nationalgallery.org.uk/...piece

Dutch Boats in a Gale is an 1801 oil on canvas seascape painting by the English artist J. M. W. Turner. It depicts two boats with Dutch fishermen struggling to avoid a collision. The sea is agitated by a gale and dark clouds above increase the sense of danger.

Turner called it Dutch Boats in a Gale: Fishermen Endeavouring to Put Their Fish on Board, but it later became known as The Bridgewater Seapiece, as it was commissioned by Francis Egerton, 3rd Duke of Bridgewater. The Duke wanted a companion for Ships on a Stormy Sea (c. 1672), a painting by the 17th-century Dutch marine artist Willem van de Velde the Younger. Turner's painting has a very similar composition to van de Velde's original to complement the dutch master's work.

Dutch Boats was presented by Turner at the Royal Academy's 1801 Annual Exhibition and was immediately recognized as a masterpiece. It received praise from academics and art critics, with the Academy's president comparing it to a Rembrandt. It was also the most popular piece in the show.

A year after its exhibition, and influenced by the painting's accolades, the Academy accepted Turner as a full Royal Academician. At the age of 26, Turner became the youngest artist to reach this status in the history of the Academy.

== Background ==
Dutch Boats was presented by Turner at the Royal Academy's 1801 Annual Exhibition. In 1796, Turner had exhibited his first oil painting, Fishermen at Sea; a seascape with a moonlit, dramatic sky.

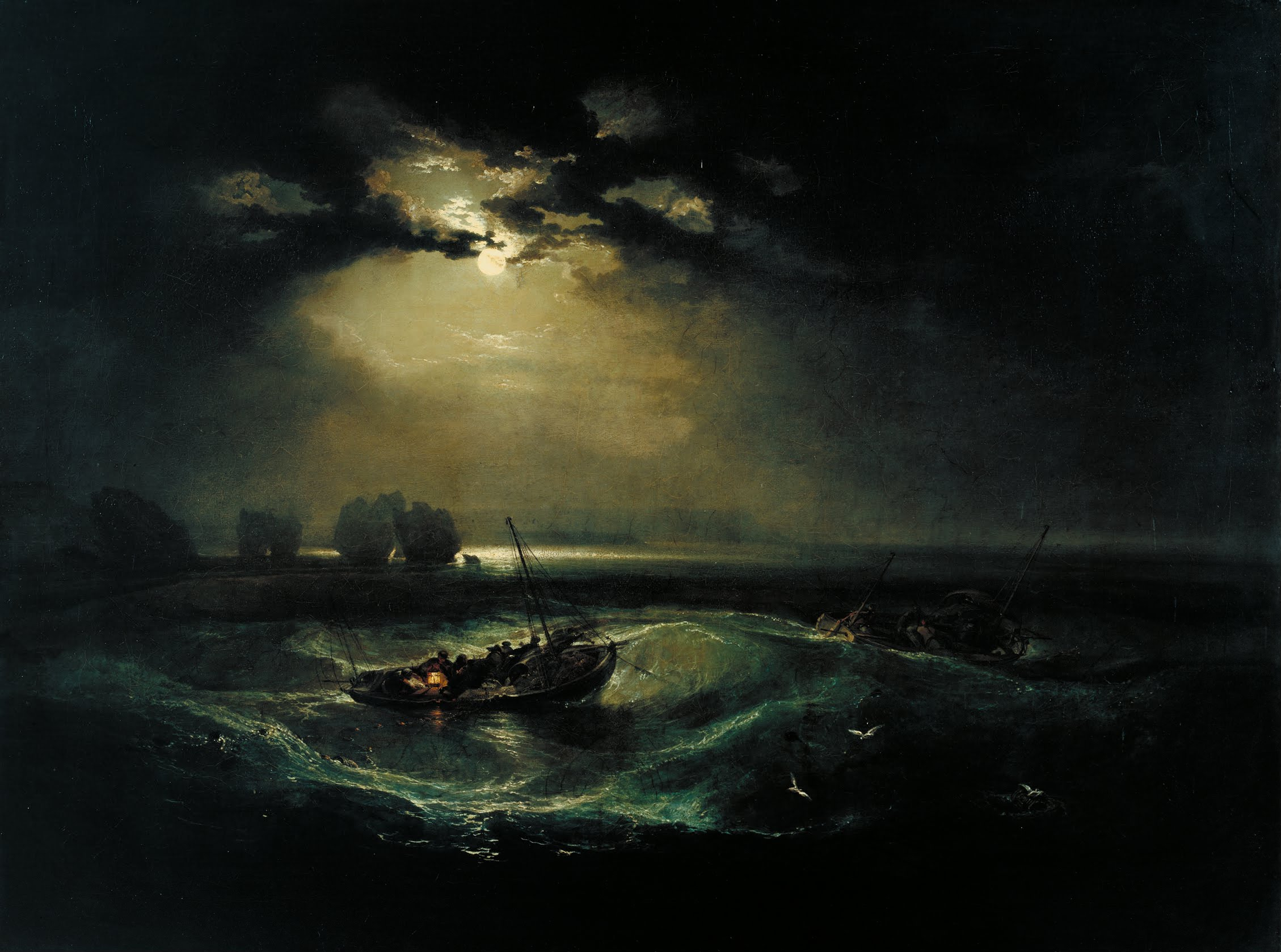
Fishermen at Sea, J. M. W. Turner (1796). Tate Gallery, London.

Following the teachings of Joshua Reynolds, the first president of the Academy, Turner made many paintings in the style of old masters. But Turner was also very commercially-oriented and keenly attuned to what the art collectors craved for. At the time, marine paintings in the dutch style were very popular, so along with Dutch Boats, he also presented two other such paintings: Fishermen Upon a Lee-Shore in Squally Weather and Ships Bearing Up for Anchorage; the latter bought by George Wyndham, 3rd Earl of Egremont. However, Turner's natural talent allowed him to go beyond pastiches and show he could make their style his own; a sort of homage, and in some cases, an indirect critique, of the old masterpieces.

== Commission ==
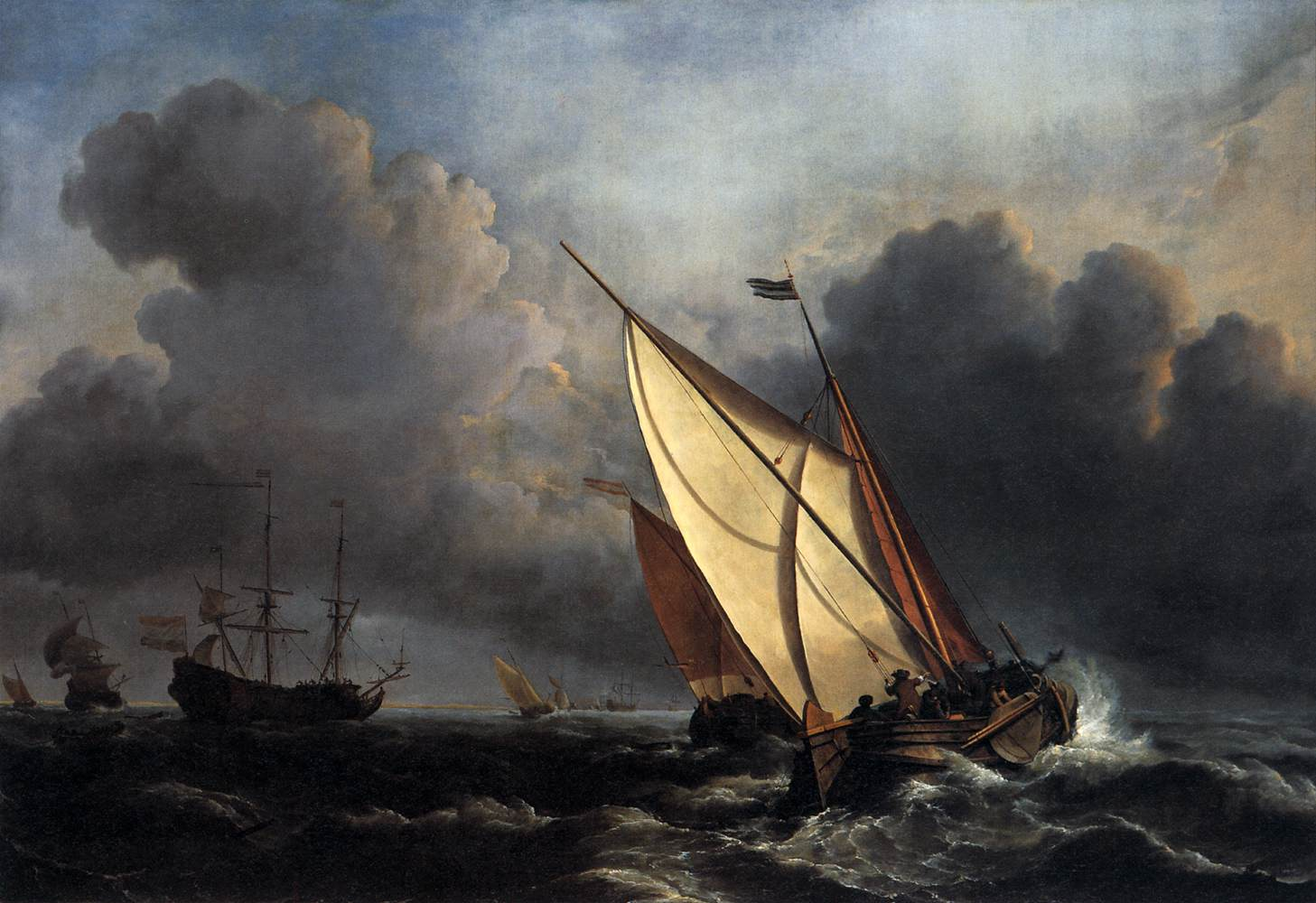
Ships on a Stormy Sea, Willem van de Velde the Younger (c. 1672). Toledo Museum of Art.

The coal and canal-building magnate Francis Egerton, 3rd Duke of Bridgewater wanted a companion pendant for Ships on a Stormy Sea (Dutch: Schepen op een stormachtige zee), a painting by the 17th-century Dutch marine artist Willem van de Velde the Younger. Due to this commission, Turner's painting became known as The Bridgewater Seapiece.

The Duke of Bridgewater's payment for the five-by-seven-foot (1.6 × 2.2 m) Dutch Boats was 250 guineas (equivalent to over £20,000 today). This was the highest amount Turner had received for a painting at the time.

To the surprise of his elders, while still in his early twenties (Note: At the time, Turner's peer John Constable was selling portraits to Suffolk farmer for two or three guineas.) Turner was able to sell his large paintings at top markets prices, even though the war between England and France had considerably reduced their demand. In 1799 Turner had received 150 guineas (Note: At the time, Turner's peer John Constable was selling portraits to Suffolk farmer for two or three guineas.) for The Fifth Plague of Egypt from the extremely rich owner of sugar plantations in Jamaica, William Beckford. He also sold smaller pieces, which generated a steady income. His friend and diarist Joseph Farington records that Turner boasted to him that he had orders from different customers for 60 watercolours.

== Description ==
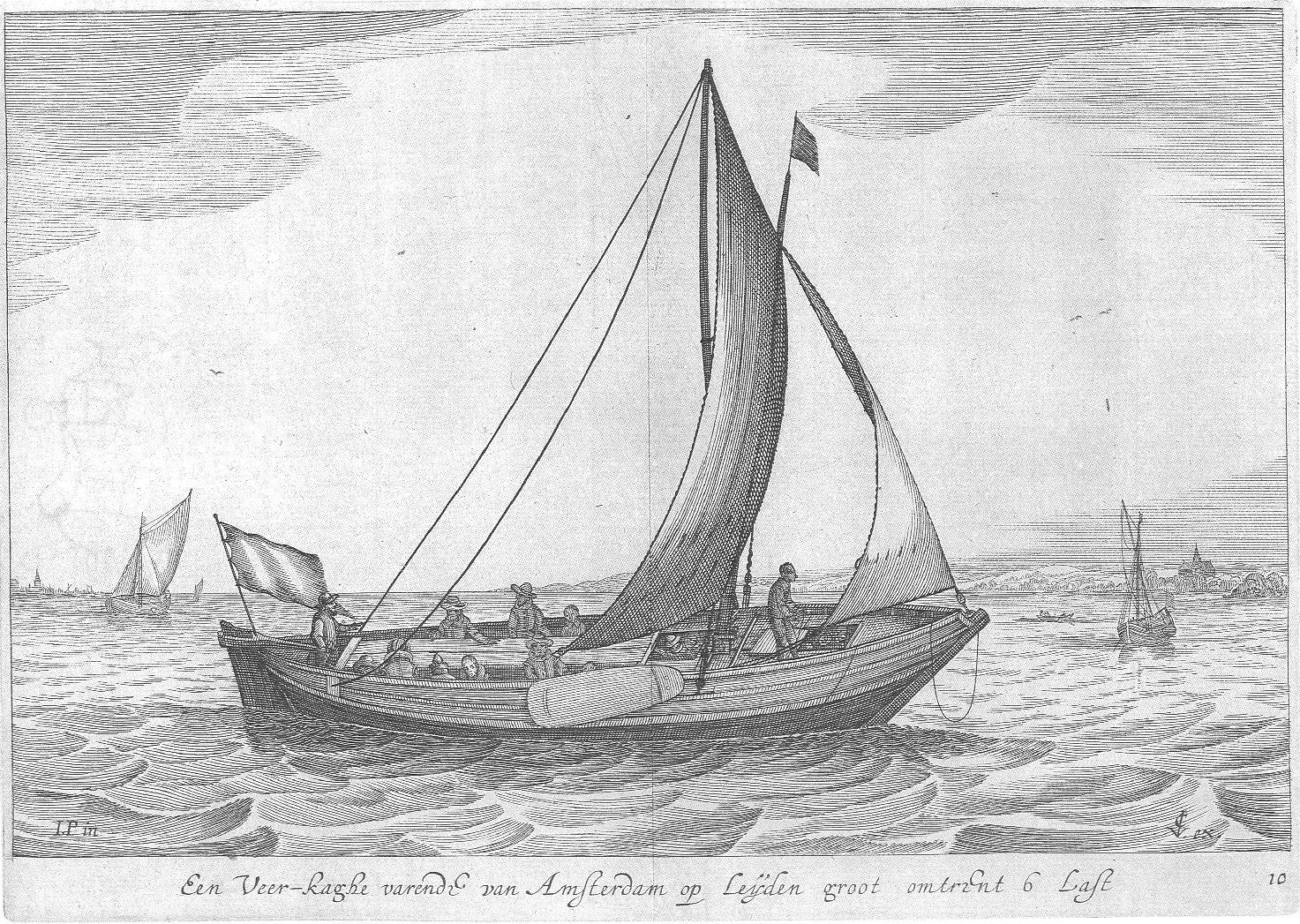
Dutch kaag, drawing by Jan Porcellis (c. 1627)

Dutch Boats portrays two spritsail boats in a rough sea, with Dutch fishermen struggling to avoid a collision.Turner emulated van de Velde's technical precision in depicting ships in his rendering of the two kaags, as these small sailboats were called in the Netherlands.

The sea is being whipped up by a gale that is violently crashing into the boats, leaving white foam on the ocean surface. Above, menacing black clouds increase the sense of danger. In the distance, the silhouette of a man-of-war, described by Butlin as an element that provides "a vast sense of maritime scale."

== Style and composition ==
Dutch Boats' composition was very similar to Van de Velde's original painting, as it was commissioned to be hung next to it. Turner mirrored the strong diagonal that is formed by the spritsail in the latter, but he did it in reverse, so that it creates a compositional complement to the original. The yellow sails illuminated by a strong light – making them stand out against the background of dark clouds – are also a pictorial element in Van de Velde's work.

Kitson notes that a preparatory sketch for the painting, suggests that Turner's main objective was to transmit the peril that the fishermen were facing. He observes that "the bold chiaroscuro and expressive use of pen and brown ink are both characteristics that seem to reflect the influence of pen drawings by Rembrandt."

== Critical reception ==
When it was exhibited at the Royal Academy's Annual Exhibition of 1801, it "took the Academy by storm". Critics thought very favorably of it, with one noting it was "a peculiar favourite of the spectators" at the exhibition", which that year attracted close to fifty thousand visitors.

The painting was hung in the best location in Great Room, where the best paintings were exhibited: in the center of the wall opposite the entrance. Benjamin West, the president of the Royal Academy, remarked that it was "what Rembrandt thought of but could not do"; a strong compliment for such a young painter. Henry Fuseli, Professor of Painting at the Academy, referred to it as "the best work in the entire exhibition," which at the time, included over 1,000 paintings.

The wide acclaim received by the painting (Note: The painter John Constable, of the same age as Turner and envious of Turner's early success, was not as enthusiastic, saying that it "only look'd cold and unfinished.") led to Turner being elected to full Royal Academician status a year later. At the early age of 26, he became the youngest Academician in the history of the institution. (Note: At the time, the number of Academicians was limited to 40. Today, the number is topped at 80.) A close friend of Turner recalled that years later, Turner had picked up a mezzotint after Van de Velde, and emotionally exclaimed that the Dutch artists "had made me a painter."

== Provenance ==
After Francis Egerton's death, only a couple of years after he commissioned Dutch Boats, the work passed to his nephew, George Granville Leveson-Gower, 2nd Marquess of Stafford (later 1st Duke of Sutherland), and subsequently to the latter's second son, Lord Francis Egerton, 1st Earl of Ellesmere.

More recently, it was bought by the British property developer and art patron Harry Hyams, who gave it on loan to the National Gallery in 1998. In his will, Hyams stipulated that the painting should remain on loan to the National Gallery, (Note: After Hyams' death in 2016, there were concerns the painting would be auctioned. Its base auction price was estimated at over £100 million, which was beyond the financial capabilities of any museum in England. After Hyams' will was made public, The Times reported the news with the headline: "Squall averted as tycoon saves prize Turner".) where it has since remained on display.

The companion painting by Van de Velde is at the Toledo Art Museum. The two paintings were temporarily reunited for the first time in 170 years, for a Tate Britain exhibition in 2009.

== See also ==
- List of paintings by J. M. W. Turner

== Bibliography ==
- Bailey, A. (2013). J. M. W. Turner: Standing in the Sun. London: Tate Enterprises Ltd.
- Butlin, M.; Joll, E. (1977). The Paintings of J. M. W. Turner. New Haven and London: Yale University Press.
- Hamilton, James (2007). Turner. New York: Random House Trade Paperbacks. ISBN 978-0-8129-6791-3.
- Moorby, N. (2025). Turner and Constable: Art, Life, and Landscape. London: Yale University Press. ISBN 978-0300275810.
- Shanes, Eric (2004). Turner: The Life and Masterworks (Rev. and updated 3rd ed.). New York: Parkstone Press. ISBN 978-1-85995-905-3.
