= Colonel William Fitch and His Sisters =

Painting by John Singleton Copley

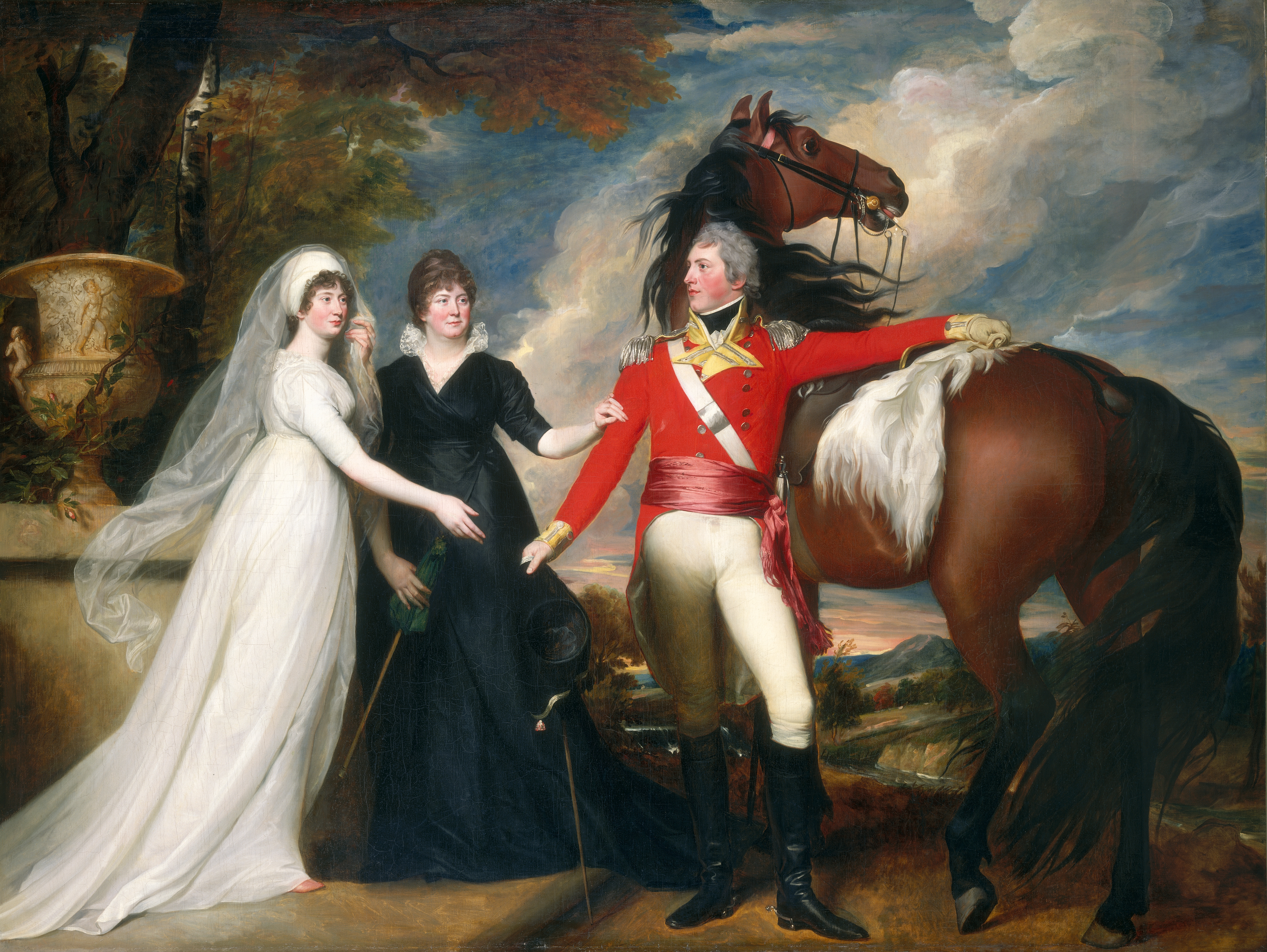
- Artist: John Singleton Copley
- Year: 1801
- Type: Oil on canvas, portrait painting
- Dimensions: 257.8 cm × 340.4 cm (101.5 in × 134.0 in)
- Location: National Gallery of Art, Washington D.C.

Colonel William Fitch and His Sisters is an 1801 portrait painting by the Anglo-American artist John Singleton Copley. It depicts William Fitch with his two sisters. A colonel in the British Army, Fitch is shown in the uniform of the 83rd Foot. He was killed in action in Second Maroon War in 1795. The family had roots in Connecticut and were friendly with Benedict Arnold and his wife Peggy Shippen in their later years in London.

Copley had relocated to England in 1775 and produced portraits alongside notable history paintings such as The Death of the Earl of Chatham and The Defeat of the Floating Batteries at Gibraltar. The painting was displayed at the Royal Academy Exhibition of 1801 held at Somerset House in London. The picture is now in the collection of the National Gallery of Art in Washington D.C., having been gifted in 1960.

== Bibliography ==
- Kamensky, Jane. A Revolution in Color: The World of John Singleton Copley. W. W. Norton & Company, 2016.
- Merrill, Jane & Endicott, John. The Late Years of Benedict Arnold: Fugitive, Smuggler, Mercenary, 1780-1801. McFarland, 2022.
- Prown, Jules David. John Singleton Copley: In England, 1774-1815. National Gallery of Art, Washington, 1966.
