= Portrait of Horatio Nelson =

Painting by William Beechey

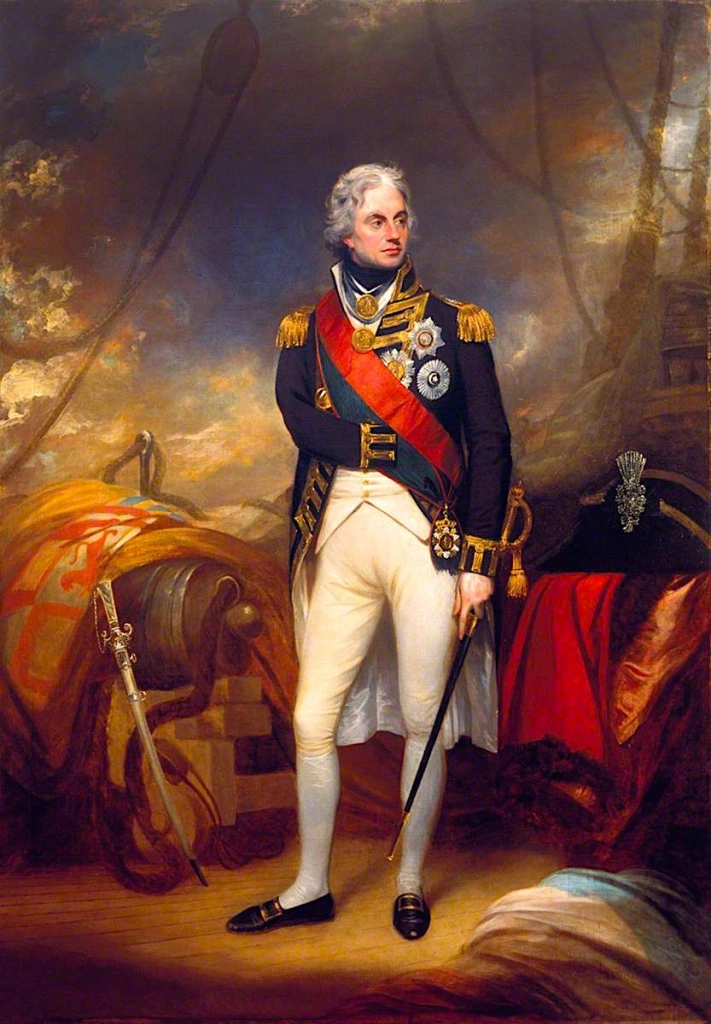
- Artist: William Beechey
- Year: 1801
- Type: Oil on canvas, portrait painting
- Dimensions: 261.4 cm × 182.6 cm (102.9 in × 71.9 in)
- Location: St Andrews' Hall, Norwich

Portrait of Horatio Nelson is an 1801 full-length portrait of the British admiral Horatio Nelson, 1st Viscount Nelson by the English artist William Beechey. It depicts Nelson in the full dress uniform of rear admiral.

It was commissioned by the Corporation of the City of Norwich, the capital of Nelson's native county Norfolk. It cost £210. It depicts Nelson following his triumph at the Battle of the Nile, in the period he was Britain's most famous living admiral. Four years later he was killed during his victory at the Battle of Trafalgar.

It was exhibited at the Spring Exhibition of the Royal Academy in Somerset House from April 1801. Copies were ordered by the City of London and the Drapers' Company. The original work today hangs in Norwich's St Andrew's Hall.

== Sketch portrait ==
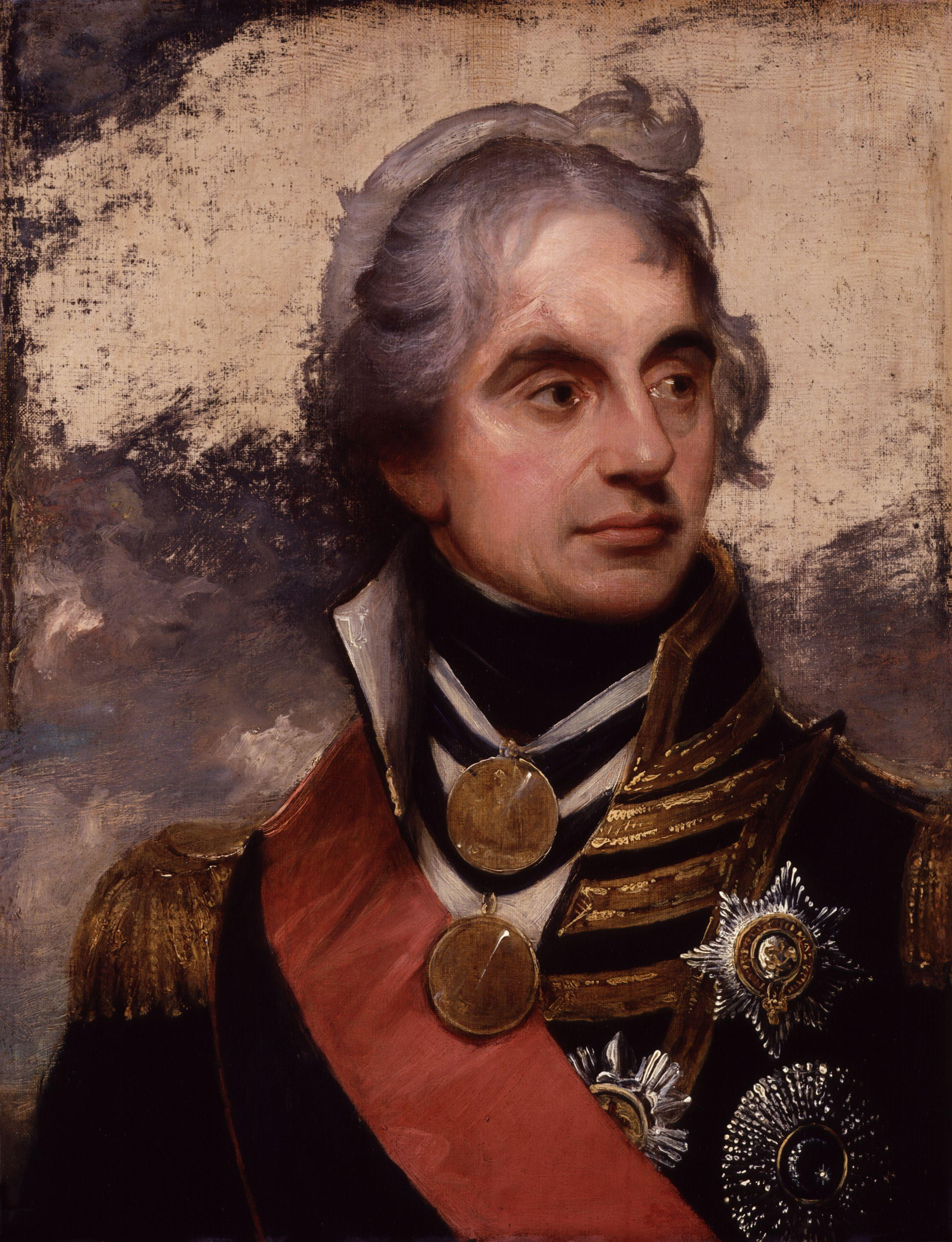
Preparatory oil sketch by Beechey, 1800, now in the National Portrait Gallery

The sketch portrait made in preparation for the larger work by Beechey still survives and is today one of the better known images of the Admiral. It was acquired by the National Portrait Gallery in 1985.

== See also ==
- Nelson and the Bear, 1809 painting by Richard Westall

== Bibliography ==
- Bond, Andrew & Cowin, Frank.Favourite of Fortune: Captain John Quilliam, Trafalgar Hero. Seaforth Publishing, 2002
- Sugden, John. Nelson: The Sword of Albion. Random House, 2012.
- White, Colin. The Nelson Companion. The History Press, 2005.
