= Coalbrookdale by Night =

1801 painting by Philip James de Loutherbourg

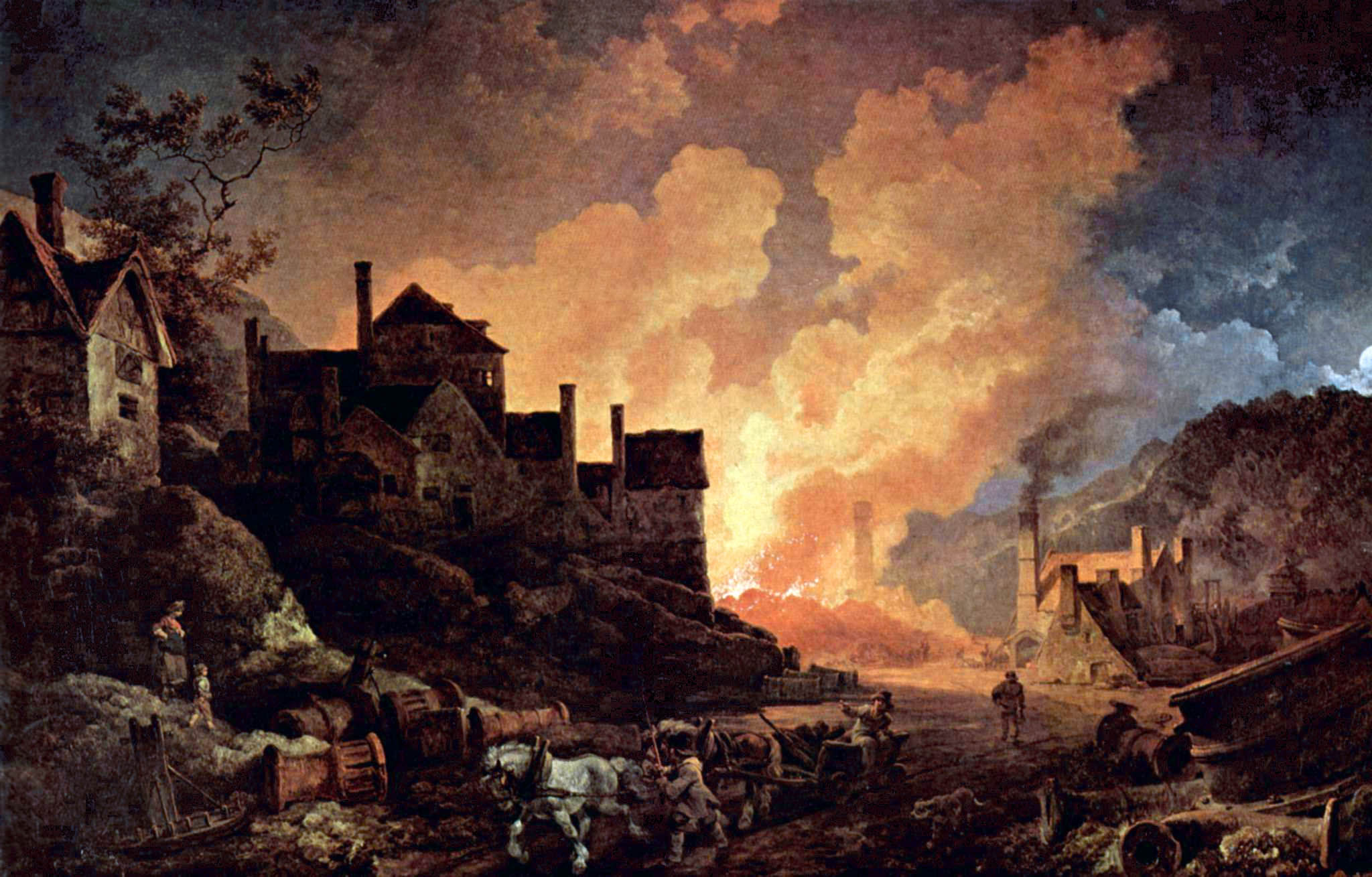
- Artist: Philip James de Loutherbourg
- Year: 1801
- Type: Oil painting
- Dimensions: 68 cm × 107 cm (27 in × 42 in)
- Location: Science Museum; London

Coalbrookdale by Night is an oil painting by Philip James de Loutherbourg, from 1801. It is held at the Science Museum, in London.

== History and description ==
The painting depicts the Madeley Wood (or Bedlam) Furnaces, which belonged to the Coalbrookdale Company from 1776 to 1796. The picture has come to symbolize the birth of the Industrial Revolution in the Ironbridge Gorge, Shropshire, England.

Loutherbourg undertook tours of England and Wales during 1786 and 1800, observing industrial activity at the time. Coalbrookdale by Night provides a view of the Bedlam Furnaces in Madeley Dale, downstream along the River Severn from the town of Ironbridge itself.

Professor Brian Lukacher dubbed the picture as "the best known example" of the industrial sublime, a minor genre in romantic picture that specialized in representing industrial settings. In his words, the picture is "at once a celebration of the energy unleashed by a coke-fired blast furnace and an early reckoning with its environmental consequences".
