= William Redmore Bigg =

English painter

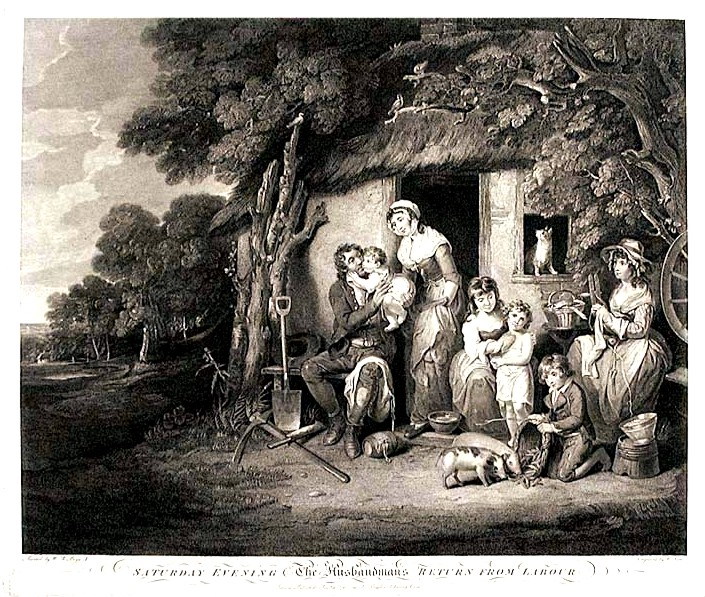
Saturday evening - The Husbandman's return from labour.

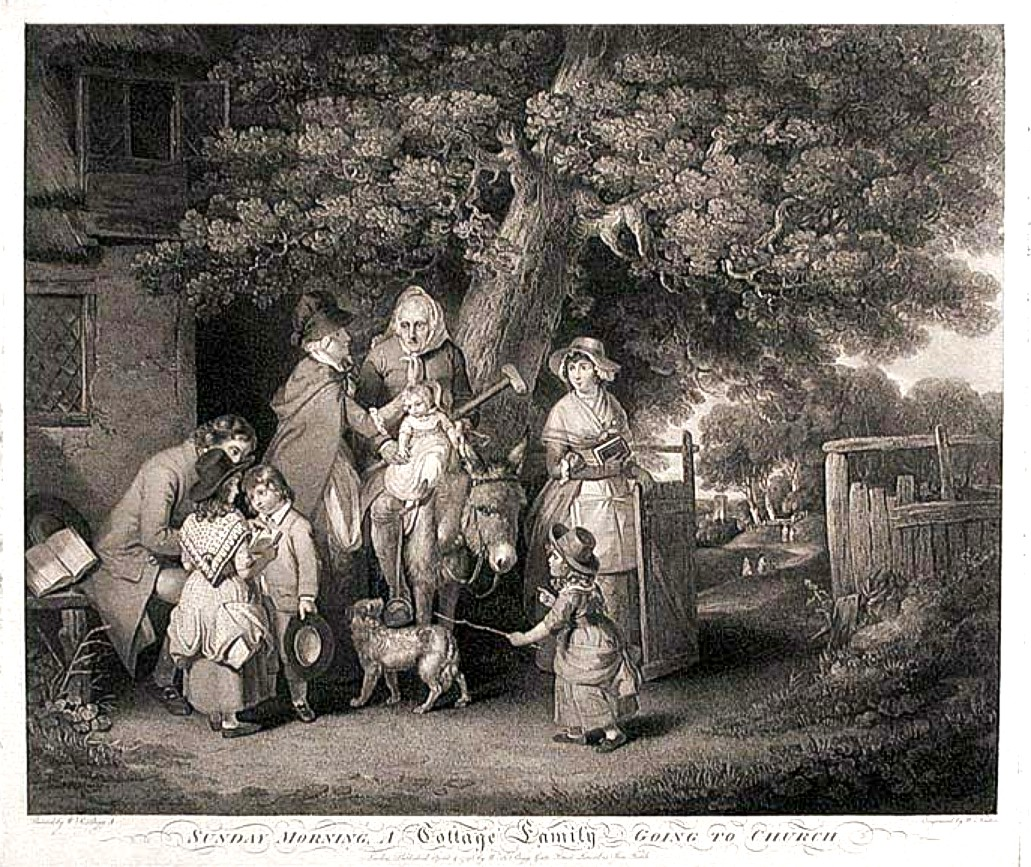
Sunday morning - A Cottage Family going to church.

William Redmore Bigg RA (Felsted, Essex 6 January 1755 – 6 February 1828 London) was a British painter.

Bigg was born in Felsted in Essex to William and Grace Bigg. He enrolled in the Royal Academy schools in 1778 where he studied under Edward Penny RA (1714–1791) whose forte was depicting acts of charity. Bigg's greatest delight was in painting children. His first work in this genre to be exhibited in 1778 was Schoolboys giving Charity to a Blind Man. A year later he painted a similar work, A Lady and her Children relieving a Distressed Cottager. Apart from these his Palemon and Lavinia, the Shipwrecked Sailor Boy, and Youths relieving a Blind Man were very well received, and all were engraved. His subject choice and execution place him with Wheatley and George Morland. Bigg produced many small portraits in oil and pastel, as well as rustic genre paintings. His genre paintings and portraits have great charm and were highly popular in his day, the best engravers being used to render his work.

Bigg exhibited regularly at the Royal Academy and the British Institution until his death. After having been an associate for many years, he was elected an RA in 1814. He died in London.

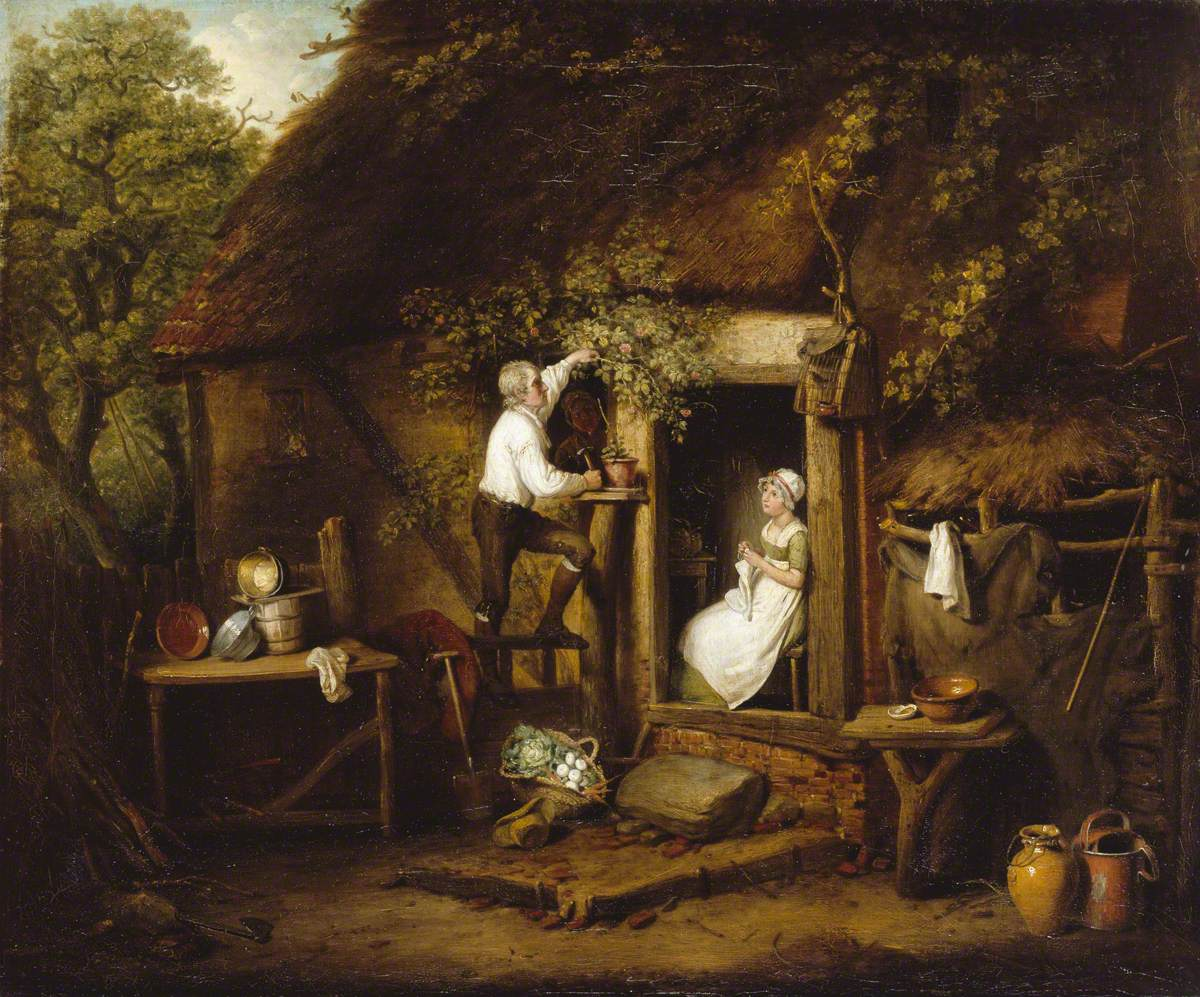
Cottagers, 1814, his diploma work for the Royal Academy
