= Uniforms of Napoleon =

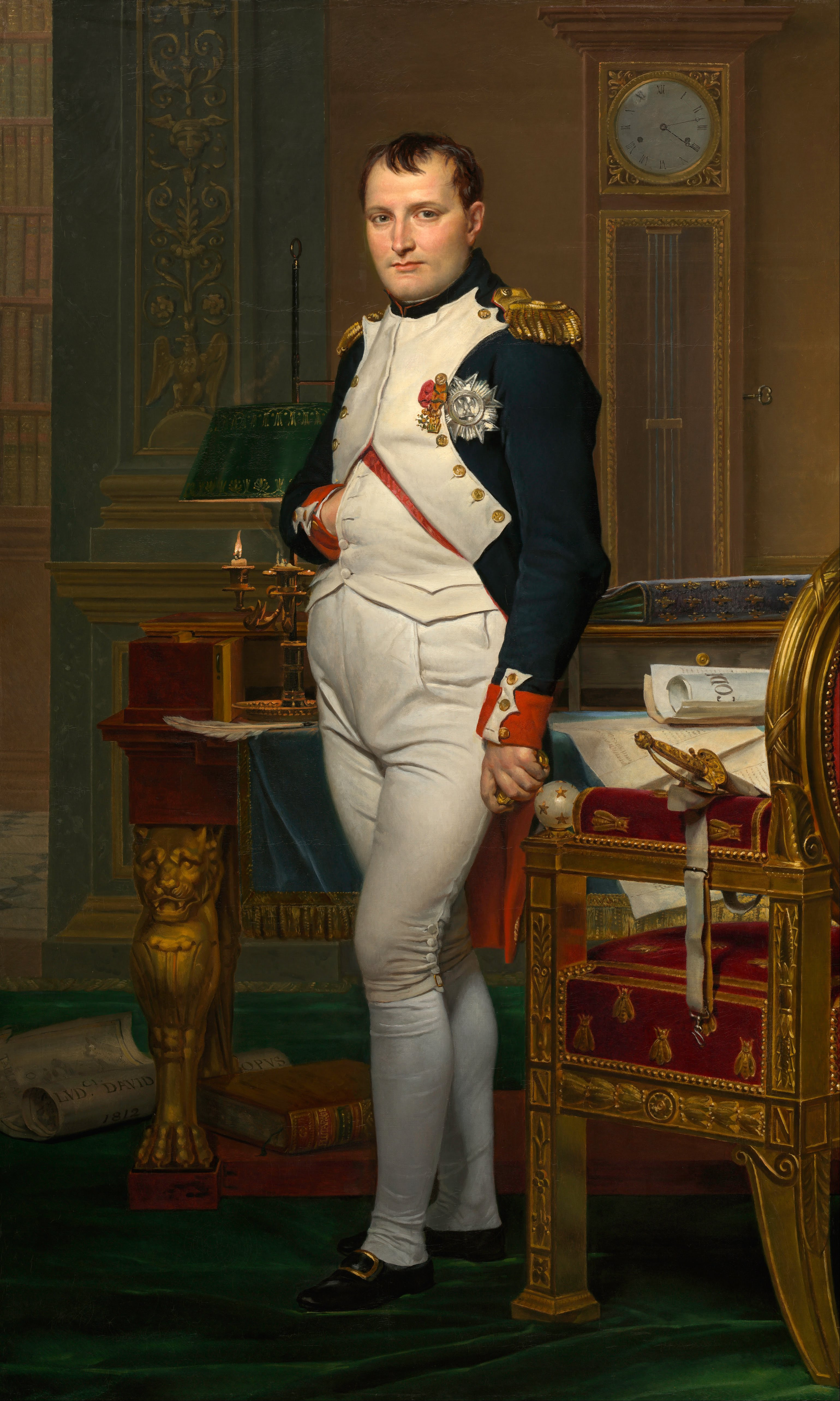
- The Emperor Napoleon in His Study at the Tuileries, 1812

Emperor of the French
- 1st reign: 18 May 1804 – 6 April 1814
- Successor: Louis XVIII (Note: As King of France)
- 2nd reign: 20 March 1815 – 22 June 1815
- Successor: Louis XVIII

First Consul of the French Republic
- In office 13 December 1799 – 18 May 1804
- Born: 15 August 1769; Ajaccio, Corsica, Kingdom of France
- Died: 5 May 1821 (aged 51); Longwood, Saint Helena
- Burial: 15 December 1840; Les Invalides, Paris
- Spouses: Joséphine de Beauharnais (m. 1796; ann. 1810) Marie Louise of Austria (m. 1810; sep. 1814)
- Issue more...: Napoleon II

At the beginning of his career, Napoleon Bonaparte was a soldier and wore the uniform of the French Revolutionary Army. In 1793 he was promoted to Général de brigade, in 1795 Général de division, and in 1796 he became commander in chief of the Army of Italy. In those capacities, he wore the uniform of a French Army general as promulgated by the regulations of January 1796. This was (as shown in the pictures below), a double breasted blue (woollen) coat with red collar, red cuffs with white flaps, gold oak-leaf embroidery on the collar, cuffs, pickets and front and rear openings, and a red and white sash with gold trim. There does not seem at this point to be any differentiation between grades of general. Napoleon wore this in Italy, Egypt, and at the Battle of Marengo in 1800 (see the portrait below "Napoleon Crossing the Alps").

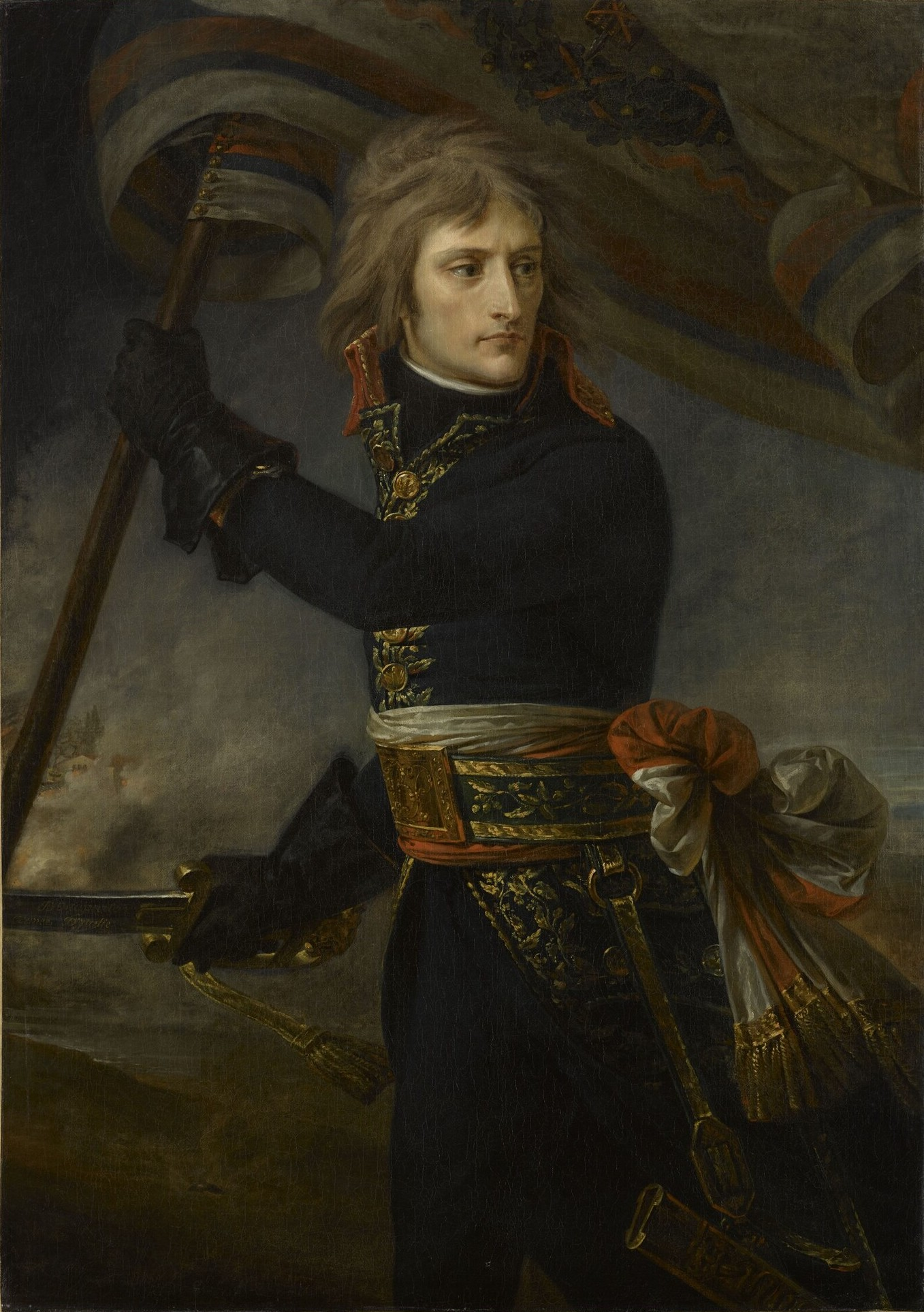
Bonaparte at the Pont d'Arcole in November 1796 by Antoine-Jean Gros in 1796.

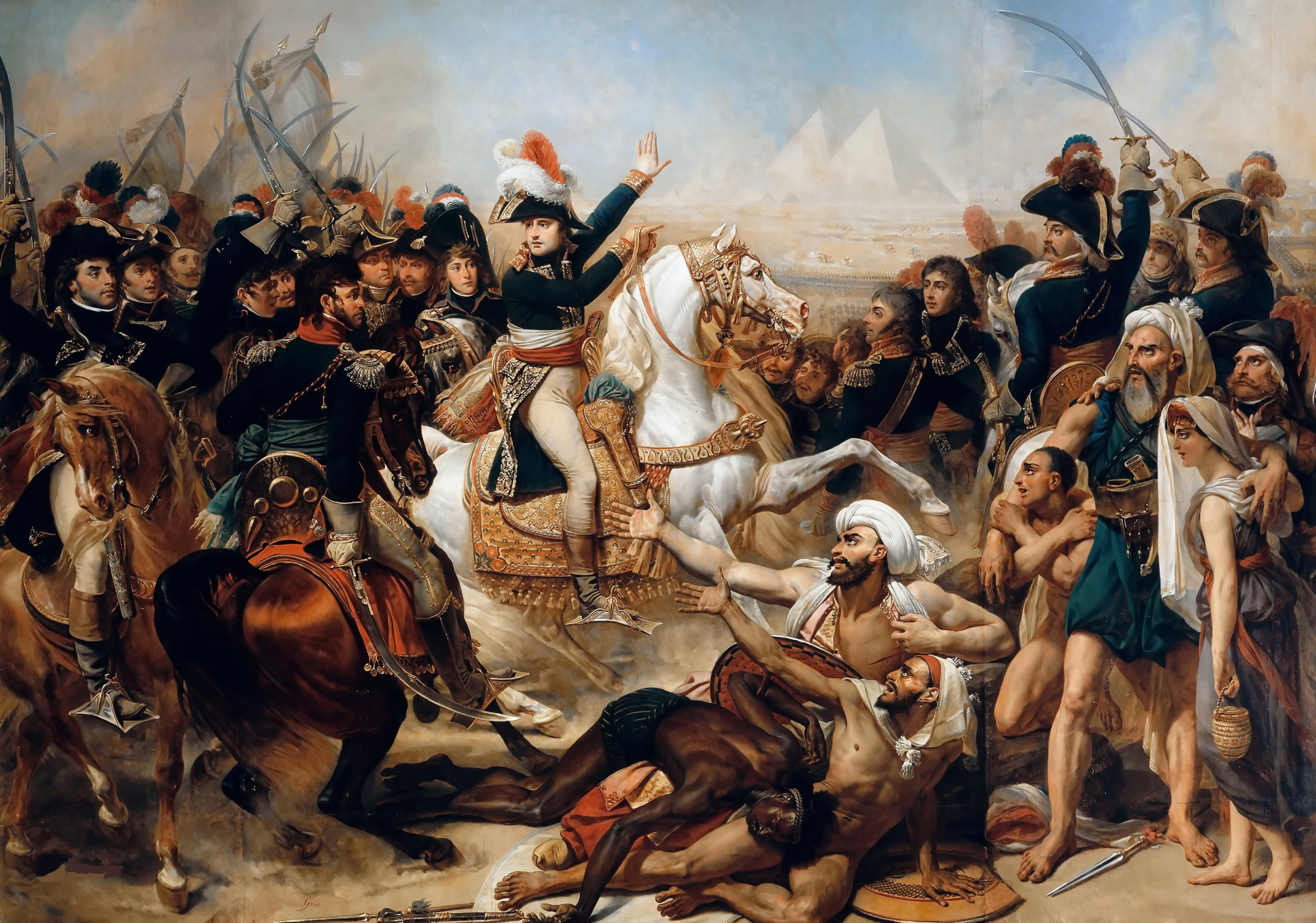
Battle of the Pyramids, July 21, 1798, by Antoine-Jean Gros in 1810 "From the top of those pyramids, forty centuries are contemplating you."

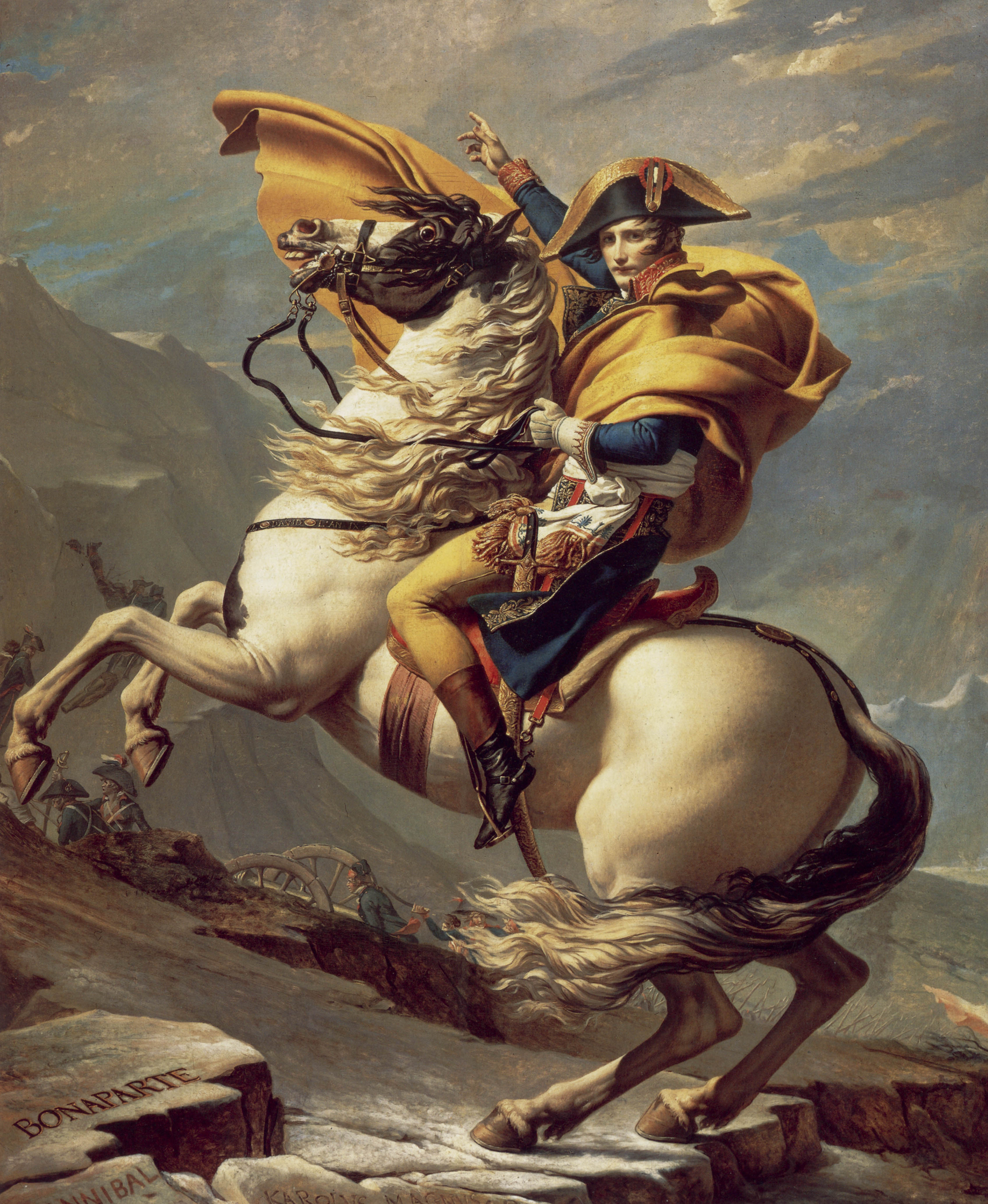
Napoleon crossing the Alps by Jacques-Louis David painted 1805

Napoleon as Revolutionary General

When Napoleon became First Consul through a military coup d'etat on the 18 Brumaire, he acceded to the primary military and civil authority. The position was considered by the constitution of the Year VIII a civil one. He eschewed his general's uniform. The consuls had their official state uniforms of scarlet velvet from Lyon embroidered in gold. When he became President of the Italian Republic in 1802, he also occasionally wore a similar civil uniform, only in green velvet. During his everyday work, Napoleon had started wearing the uniform of a colonel of regiment of the Chasseurs à cheval of the Consular Guard. They were Napoleon's personal guard.

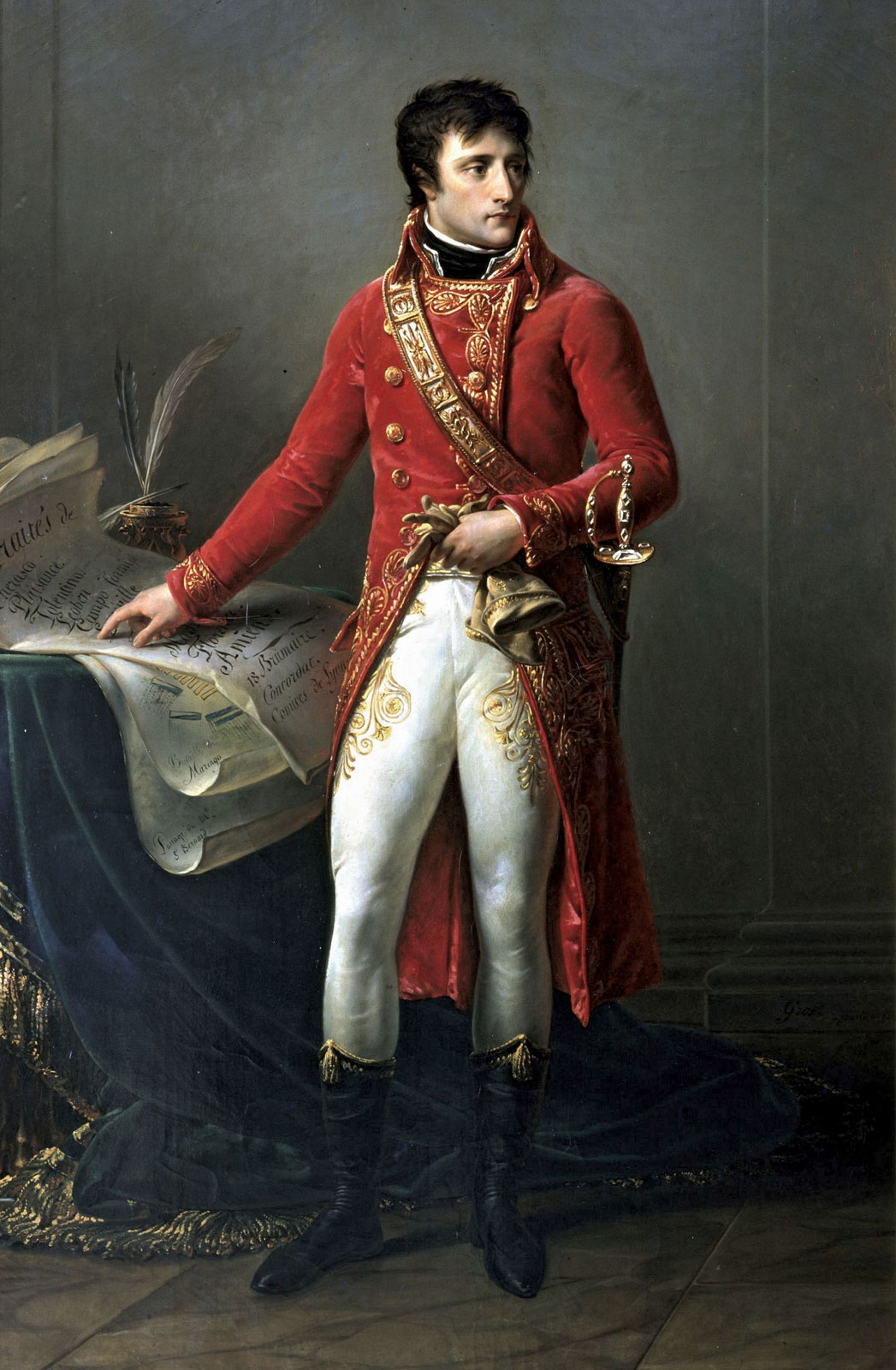
Antoine-Jean Gros, c. 1802 in the civil uniform of First Consul.

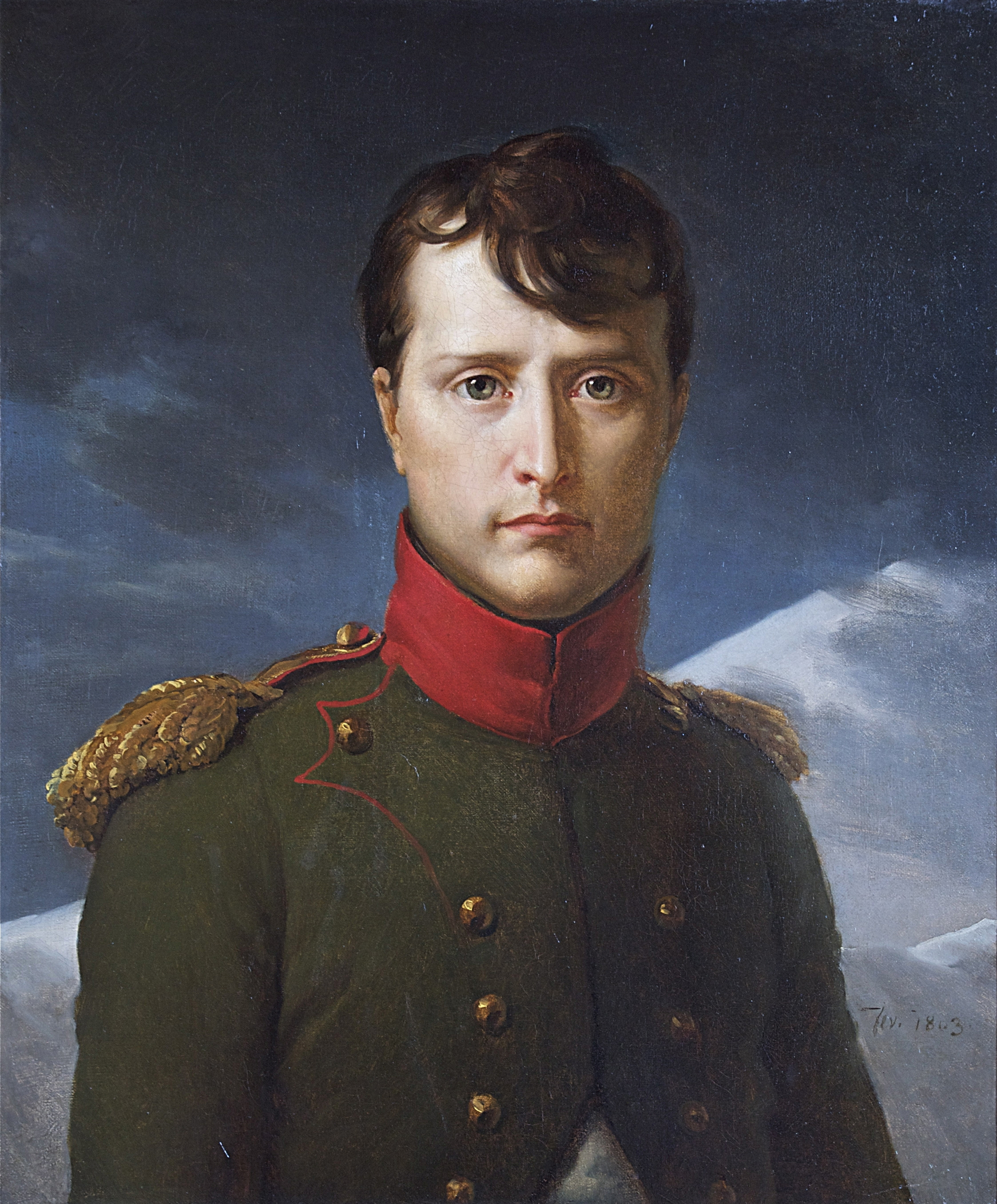
Napoleon in 1803 as First Consul in his habitual uniform of a colonel of regiment of the Chasseurs à cheval de la Garde impériale, orig the Consular Guard. They were Napoleon's personal guard.

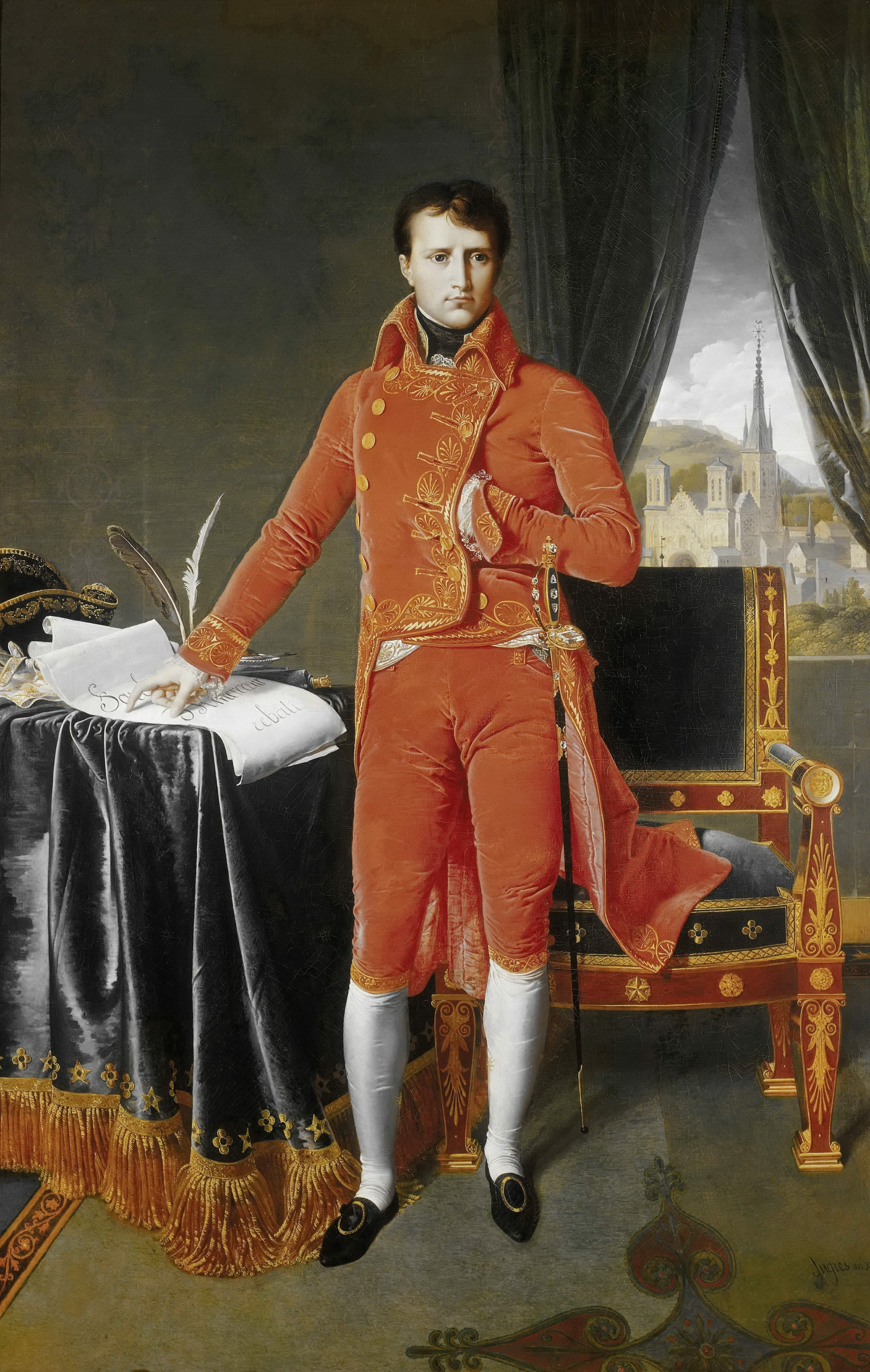
Bonaparte, First Consul in 1804 by Jean-Auguste-Dominique Ingres

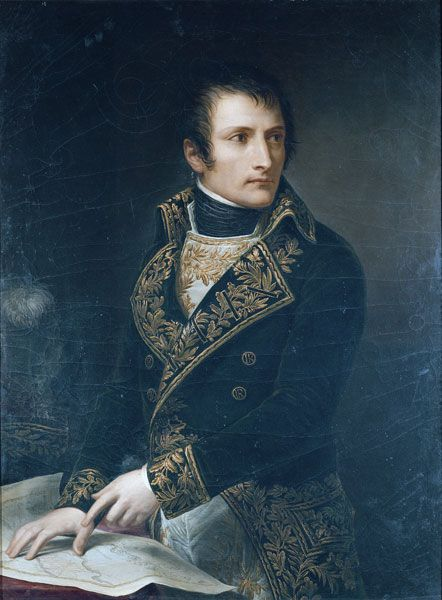
Napoleon as President of the Italian Republic

Napoleon as First Consul

Napoleon very rarely wore elaborate clothing, but during his Coronation he had special robes made of a white velvet vest with gold embroidery and diamond buttons, a crimson velvet tunic and a short crimson coat with satin lining, a wreath of laurel on his brow. Before entering Notre Dame, Napoleon was vested in a long white satin tunic embroidered in gold thread and Josephine similarly wore a white satin empire-style dress embroidered in gold thread. During the coronation he was formally clothed in a heavy coronation mantle of crimson velvet lined with ermine; the velvet was covered with embroidered golden bees, drawn from the golden bees among the regalia that had been discovered in the Merovingian tomb of Childeric I, a symbol that looked beyond the Bourbon past and linked the new dynasty with the ancient Merovingians; the bee replaced the fleur-de-lis on imperial tapestries and garments. The mantle weighed at least eighty pounds and was supported by four dignitaries.

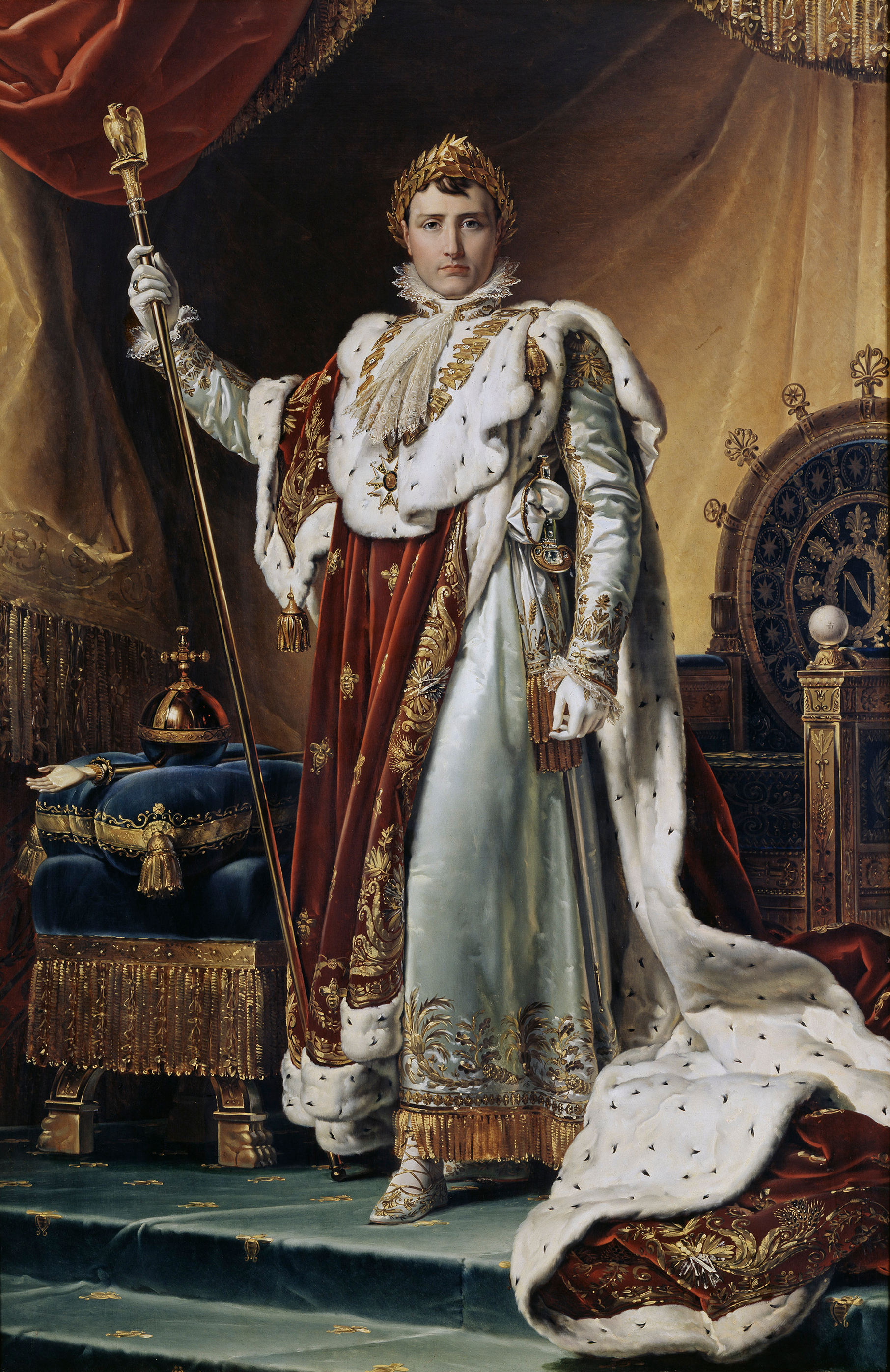
Napoleon in his coronation robes 1804 by François Gérard in 1805.

Napoleon in ceremonial dress

As Emperor, in his daily work, Napoleon wore very simple but well made clothing of a colonel of his guard, a large but plain bicorne hat with an army cockade, and grey greatcoat. He designed elaborate costumes for his marshals, officers, and senior functionaries that formed the military aristocracy of his empire. Not only did this establish an immediately recognizable image for Napoleon, but the contrast between him and the rest of the court emphasized where the real power lay. The effect can be seen in the portrait of the Battle of Austerlitz below.

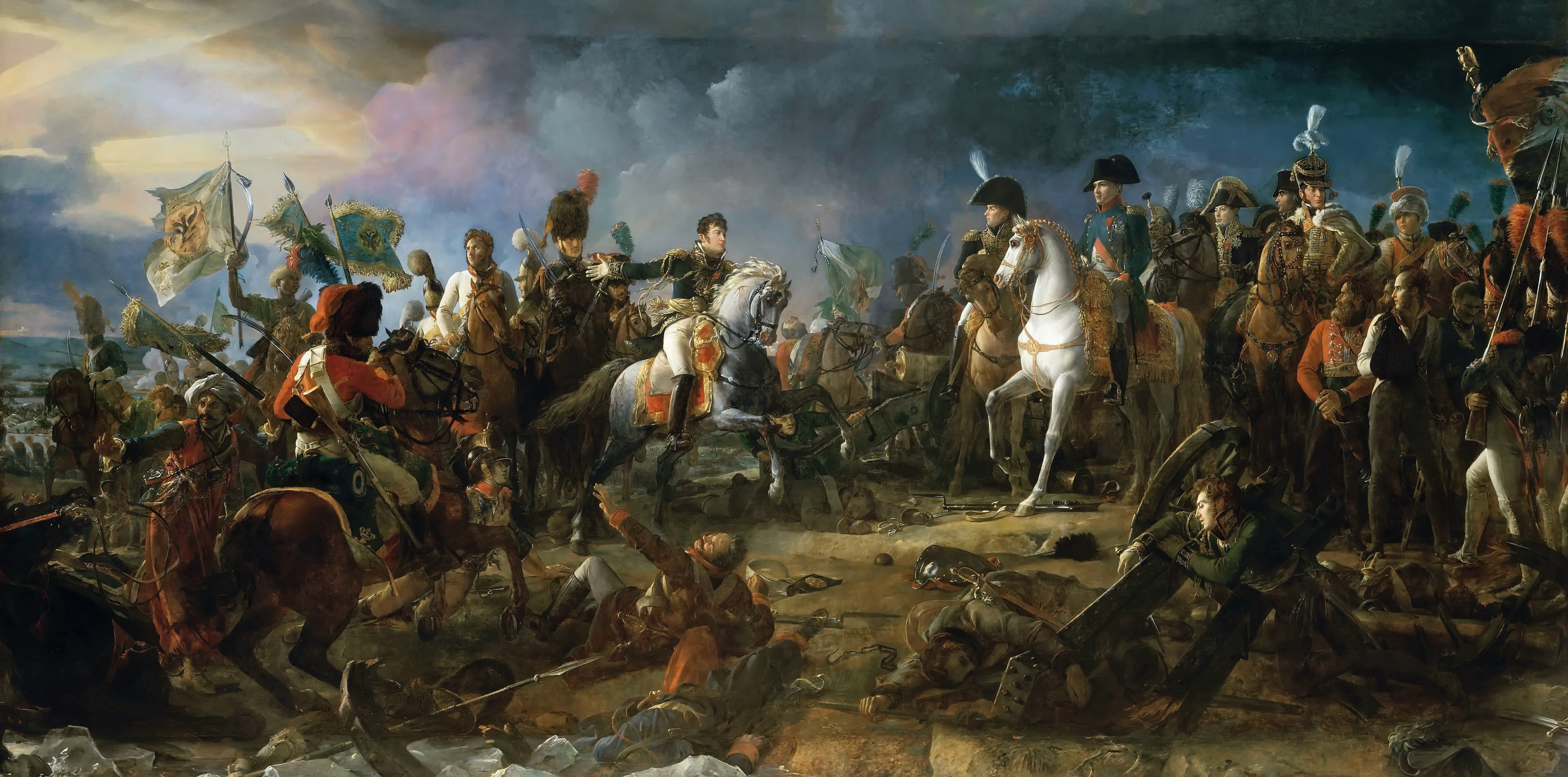
Napoleon at Austerlitz (2 December 1805)

Napoleon continued from his consular days to wear daily and on campaign the uniform of a colonel of regiment of the Chasseurs à cheval de la Garde Impériale (Vieille ) which had been his Consular Guard and provided Napoleon's personal guard. He also wore on Sundays and special occasions (accounts differ) the uniform of a colonel of the grenadiers à pied de la Garde Vieille. On his uniform jacket he always wore the star (usually embroidered into the coat) and medal of the Grand Eagle of the Legion of Honour with the red sash under his uniform coat. After the establishment of the Napoleonic Kingdom of Italy (1805) he also wore the medal of the Order of the Iron Crown.

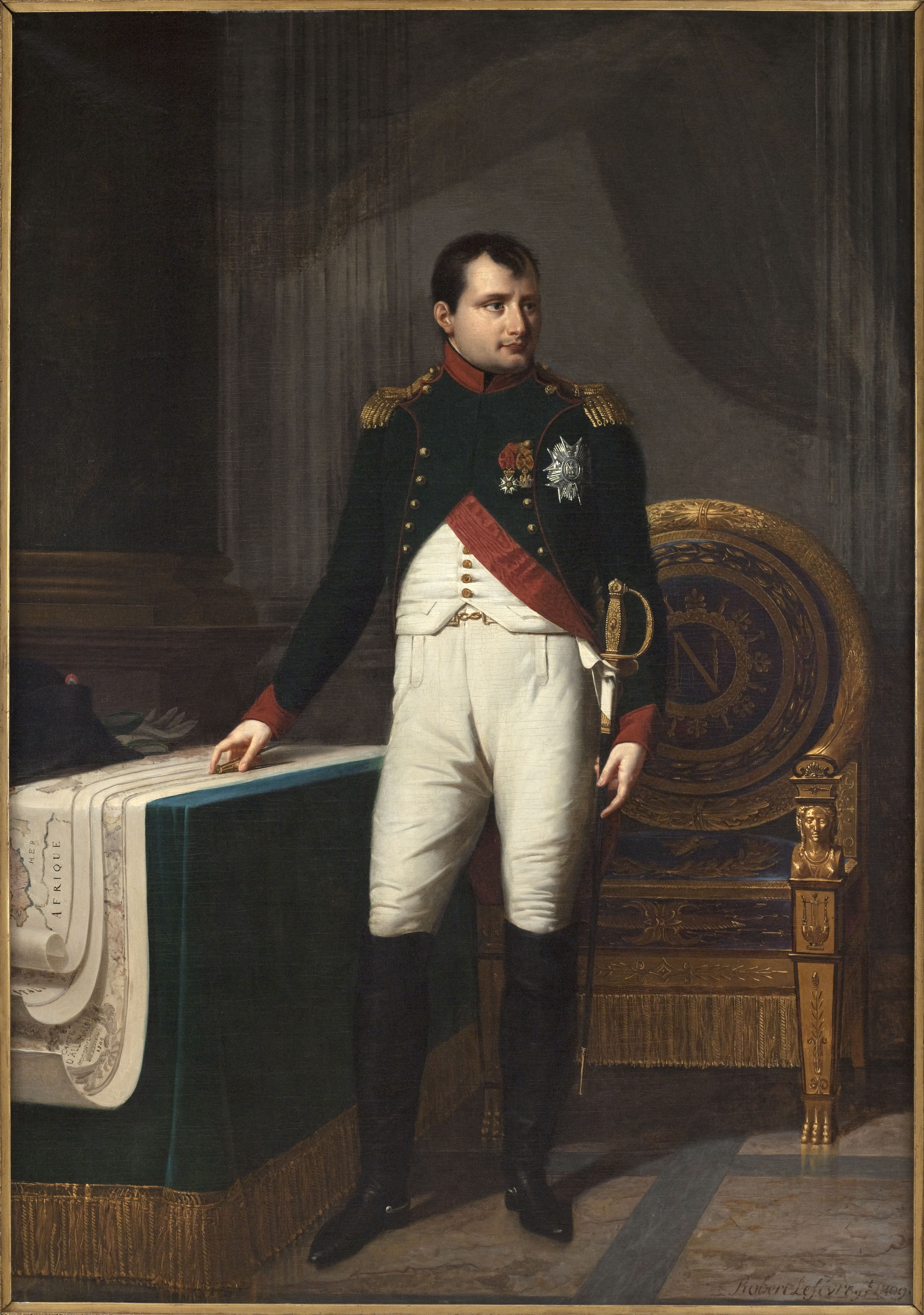
Napoleon in his daily uniform of a colonel of regiment of the Chasseurs à cheval de la Garde Impériale Vieille 1809 by Robert Lefèvre. They were Napoleon's personal guard.

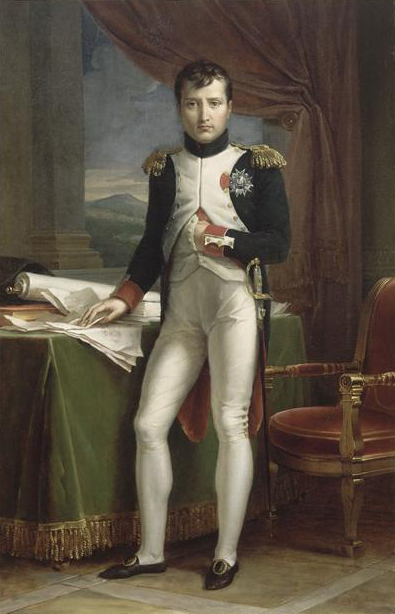
Napoléon Ier en uniforme de colonel des grenadiers à pied de la Garde Vieille, c.1812 by François Gérard depicting a younger Napoleon.

Napoleon in His Study at the Tuileries wearing the uniform of a colonel of the grenadiers à pied de la Garde Vieille by Jacques-Louis David, c.1812

Napoleon in the uniform wearing the ribbon, star and medal of the Grand Eagle of the Legion of Honour and the medal of the Iron Crown on Italy.

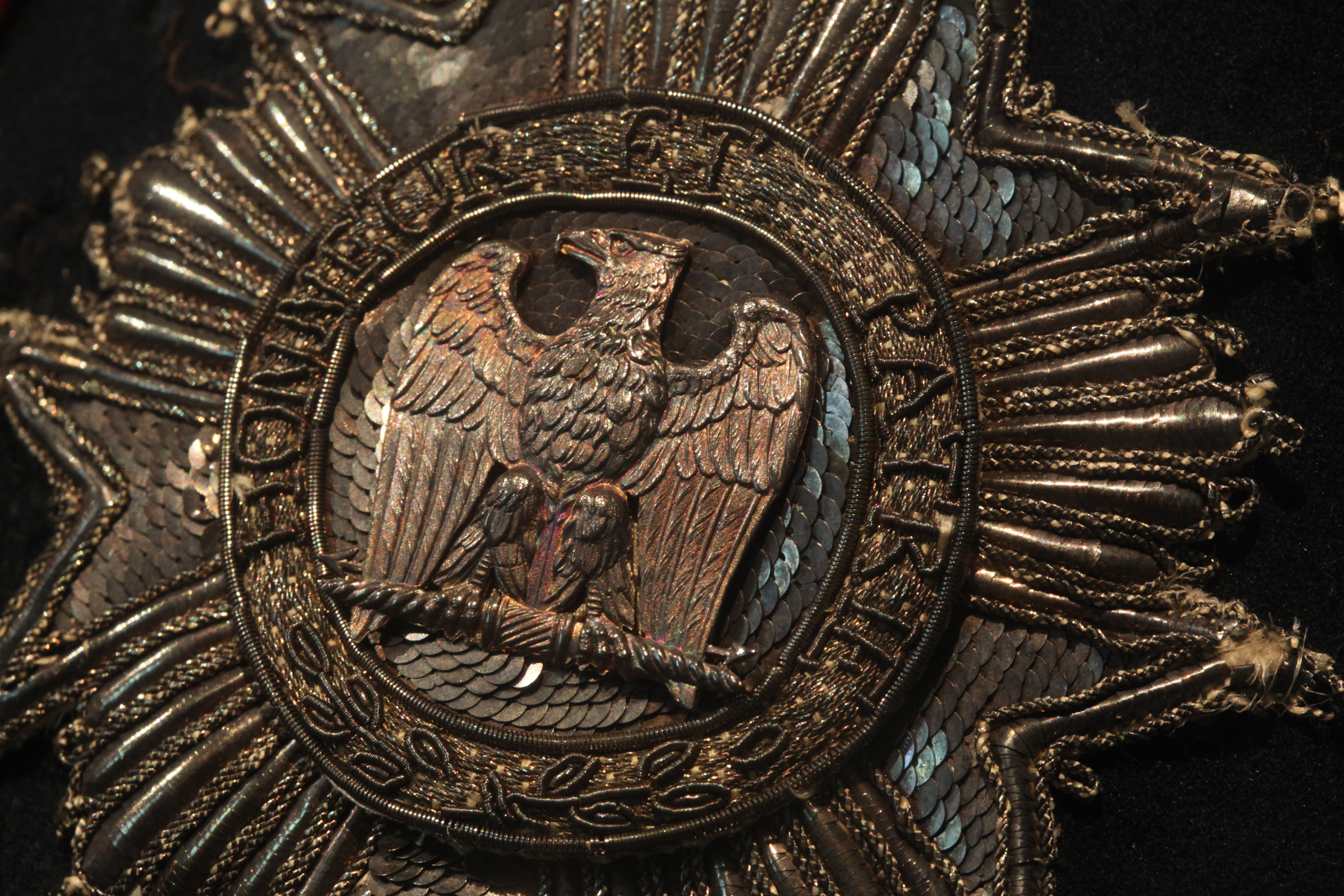
Embroided insignia of the Legion of Honour, detail of Napoléon's uniform of colonel of the Chasseurs à cheval of the Imperial Guard

For warmth, Napoleon wore his famous calf length gray greatcoat. Sometimes he wore blue or green ones. In the winter, as in Russia, he wore a longer fur lined great coat.
