= Uniforms of the Grande Armée =

Uniforms of the army of Napoleon I

The uniforms of the French Grande Armée was regulated by a system of orders, colors, and insignia to distinguish between branches of service, regiments, and ranks on the battlefield as well as during garrison duty. The dress was based on the traditions of the royal army of the Ancien Régime and the reforms of the French Revolution, but was modified several times during the Napoleonic Wars. Initially the uniforms for Infantry were white but later became blue while other branches, such as the cavalry and artillery, had their own colors cuts and garment. Due to material shortages, prolonged campaigns, and the integration of foreign contingents, the practical implementation of these regulations often deviated from the official standard.

== Marshals ==
The ceremonial uniform for Marshals of the Empire was deep blue, manufactured from silk, velvet, and featured embroidery along all seams that replicated the version used by staff officers but was one third larger. This heavily embellished caot was reserved for formal and state occasions, featuring no turnbacks to the skirt and being worn completely without epaulettes. The full dress tunic served as a more durable replica of the ceremonial dress, generally manufactured from hard-wearing linen, and it was worn with epaulettes. The blue tunic itself followed the regulations prescribed for the undress uniform of generaux de division, though the embroidery was larger by a third.

The buttons on this uniform were embossed with two crossed marshals' batons tied together with the ribbon of the Legion of Honour and surrounded by a garland of half oak and half laurel leaves. Additionally, some marshals wore aiguillettes with their full dress by reason of their office. The undress uniform provided a cheaper alternative to the ceremonial tunic, constructed with no pockets or lace to simulate them on the skirt, and completely lacking embroidery on the sleeve or back seams. It did, however, feature turnbacks on the skirt that were embellished with marshals' lace and the standard insignia common to all staff officers.

On campaign, marshals wore a plain coat that resembled a surtout, which limited lace ornamentation strictly to the collar and cuffs. The skirt of this campaign uniform was stitched with false turnbacks, remaining entirely devoid of ornament except for the gold device characteristic of staff officers. Regarding the rank insignia, the epaulettes used were based on those of a general de division but substituted the traditional stars with two marshals' batons embroidered in blue silk, though certain individuals like Bernadotte persisted in retaining up to five stars on theirs. The sashes varied greatly between individual marshals, as the regulation gold ground-cloth pattern could be replaced with white silk varieties featuring three lateral gold bands, speckled gold points, or embroidered gold star friezes. Furthermore, the tassels of these sashes were not strictly limited to blue silk batons, as many marshals opted for decorations featuring stars or Imperial eagles instead.

== Infantry ==
=== Line Infantry ===
When in 1792 the War of the First Coalition commenced most of the infantry still wore the white coats of the ancient regime. Nine regiments wore dark blue coats and 14 wore red. Regiments were distinguished by different facing colours and white or yellow buttons. In 1793 all infantry were issued with blue coats with lapels, turnback skirts and waistcoat all in white and red collar and cuffs. The trousers were also white. Regiments were distinguished by their number on the buttons and regimental plates on their helmets.

=== Officers ===
Until 1812, the generals’ uniforms consisted of a dark blue, double-breasted tunic, which featured a red collar and red lapels when in full dress, while an all-blue version was worn for daily duty. The buttons were gold-colored, and gold embroidery ran around the collar, lapels, and horizontal pocket flaps; this embroidery was single-strand for a General de Brigade and double-strand for a General de Division. In addition, golden epaulettes with heavy bouillon fringe were worn, bearing rank insignia consisting of two five-pointed stars for a General de Brigade, three stars for a General de Division, or crossed marshal's batons within a ring of silver stars for a Marshal of France. A wide silk sash with gold stripes and gold tassels served as the official insignia; it was knotted on the left side and varied in color depending on rank: white for a Marshal, red for a General de Division, and light blue for a General de Brigade. The uniform was completed by a white waistcoat, white breeches, and high black boots.

Colonels wore two gold or silver epaulettes with heavy bouillon fringe, as well as a gold sword knot. Majors also wore two epaulettes in gold or silver, but with fringe in the opposite colors, and a gold sword knot. The uniform of a battalion commander and that of a captain resembled that of a colonel, with only the left epaulette featuring fringe. The adjutant-major, had only the right epaulette adorned with fringe. The lieutenant's epaulettes were the same as those of the captain but featured a single red line along the epaulette band, while second lieutenants had two red lines on their epaulette bands. Adjutants wore two white-and-yellow lines across the epaulette band, and their epaulette fringes were mixed with red. An exception was made for the officers of the Hussars and the Chasseurs à Cheval, who did not wear epaulets; their ranks were instead indicated by a corresponding number of gold or silver chevrons above the pointed lapels and around the elaborate leg knots of their Hungarian trousers. Unless otherwise specified, the belts and undergarments—consisting of vests and trousers—were white, while the gaiters were white in summer and black in winter.

Noncommissioned officers wore various stripes and fringes as rank insignia. A Maréchal des logis chef had epaulet fringes in a mix of red and gold-silver, as well as two gold-silver diagonal stripes on a red background on the lower sleeves. A Maréchal des logis was similar, but had only a single gold-silver stripe on the lower sleeves. The Fourrier wore a gold stripe on the left upper arm and two red stripes on an orange background on the lower sleeves. A Corporal also had two red stripes on an orange background on the lower sleeves. Years of service were generally indicated by red chevrons pointing upward on the left upper arm.

=== Light infantry ===
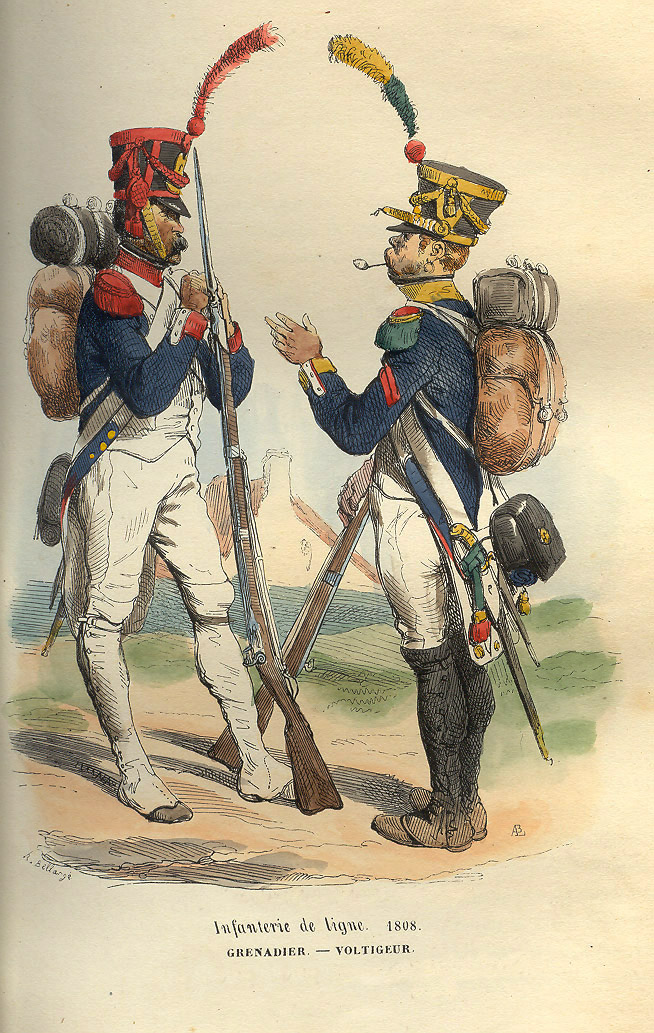
Grenadier (left) and voltigeur (right) of the line infantry in 1808

At the start of the Revolutionary Wars, the light infantry wore a dark green tunic cut in the infantry style, with horizontal pockets and white-metal buttons bearing the battalion number inside the loop of a hunting horn. The lapels were green, piped in the regimental color; collars, cuffs, and cuff flaps were either in the regimental color or green. Carabiniers wore red, fringed epaulettes, while chasseurs wore epaulettes in the tunic color, piped in the regimental color. Instead of the usual breeches and long gaiters, the light infantry wore short gaiters that reached only to the middle of the calf, usually with a curved upper edge and often decorated with colored trim and a tassel at the top. The officers’ greatcoats, introduced in 1792, were dark green with a collar in the regimental color.

Starting in 1793, the blue uniform was introduced for the light infantry in place of the previous green one, although the distinctive features that remained exclusive to the light regiments throughout this period were retained. The 1793 coat resembled that of the line infantry but featured a distinctive cut, including lapels whose lower edges tapered to a point, and almost without exception omitted the buttons and blind buttonholes found beneath the lapels of the line coat. The tunic was dark blue with dark blue lapels, cuffs, and skirts, all edged with white piping; the collar and the rectangular cuff flaps were scarlet, edged with blue (or white) piping, with the flaps bearing three (or occasionally four) buttons. Other forms of lapels were common, either the flapless version with vertical piping, as worn on many infantry coats, or pointed lapels. The lapel flaps were embroidered with insignia in the form of white hunting horns or red grenades for the Carabinieri. The buttons were made of brass, and the pockets were vertical, edged with white piping.

In addition to their shoulder straps, the Chasseurs also wore green epaulettes; the Carabiniers retained their red epaulettes. Vests were blue, often with white piping (including the pocket edging), and the legwear remained the same as before: dark blue breeches with short gaiters. To better meet the tactical demands of skirmish combat, the long coat was replaced in 1799 with a variant featuring shorter skirts. Officers generally retained the long skirts of the earlier coat. The short tunic remained dark blue, with a scarlet collar and lapels; pointed lapels, as worn by some regiments, were either blue or scarlet. The piping was white, with the same insignia on the lapels as before.

The white-metal buttons featured a hunting horn and the regimental number. In addition to blue shoulder straps with white piping, hunters often continued to wear green epaulettes; carabiniers retained their red epaulettes. The dark blue vest (often double-breasted) sometimes had white piping. Some regiments wore white linen gaiters in the summer, and on campaigns, loose-fitting trousers were common either dark blue (for winter) or white, chamois-colored, or light gray-ochre (for summer) which were worn over the gaiters.

The voltigeurs wore chamois-colored collars (piped in red or white) and occasionally had other variations in their insignia, such as yellow or chamois-colored cuff flaps or pointed cuffs. Their epaulettes were combinations of yellow, green, or red, with gaiter tassels in the same colors; yellow hunting horns were embroidered on the skirts. The officers’ uniforms resembled those of the enlisted men, but had long coat skirts. The officers’ buttons and lapel insignia were silver-colored; their silver braided epaulettes were identical to those of the line infantry: Colonel thick cord fringe on both shoulders; Major as Colonel, but with gold-embroidered fields; Chef de Bataillon as Colonel, but with fringe only on the left shoulder; Captain with silver fringe only on the left shoulder; Capitaine Adjudant-Major with braided fringe only on the right shoulder; Lieutenant like the Captain, but with a red stripe on the field; Second Lieutenant with two red stripes; Adjudant-Sous-Officier with red fields featuring two silver stripes and mixed red and silver fringe only on the left shoulder.

The gorget appeared in both gold-plated and silver versions, with the emblems usually made of contrasting metal and depicting the regiment number, the eagle, or the hunting horn; for the Carabiniers, they depicted a grenade or a grenade and a horn. Sergeants and higher ranks wore rank insignia made of silver braid on a red background, silver trim on the lapel badges and epaulet fields, as well as silver threads in the epaulet fringes, shako cords, and saber tassels; occasionally, they also wore insignia on the epaulette field, such as silver grenades for the Carabiniers.

The last change to the dress regulations came in 1812. From that point on, the uniform consisted of a dark blue tunic with short blue skirts and dark blue lapels closed to the waist, as well as pointed cuffs piped in white. The pockets were piped in white, and the collar was piped in red and blue, with the exception of the Voltigeurs, whose chamois-colored collars were piped in blue. The lapel insignia were red grenades (for the Carabiniers) and white (for the Chasseurs) or yellow hunting horns (for the Voltigeurs). The Carabiniers retained red epaulettes, while the shoulder straps for the Chasseurs were dark blue with white piping and chamois-colored with blue piping for the Voltigeurs. The blue breeches were worn with knee gaiters that were straight-cut at the top; the vest was dark blue.

== Cavalry ==
=== Carabiniers ===
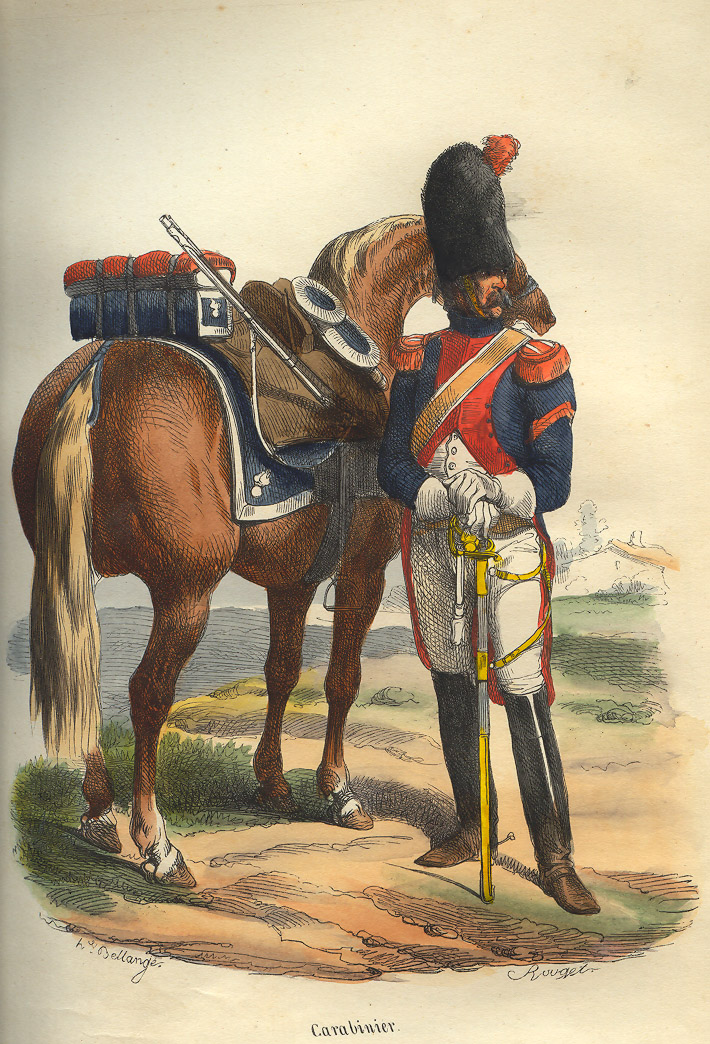
Horse carabinier's uniform before 1809

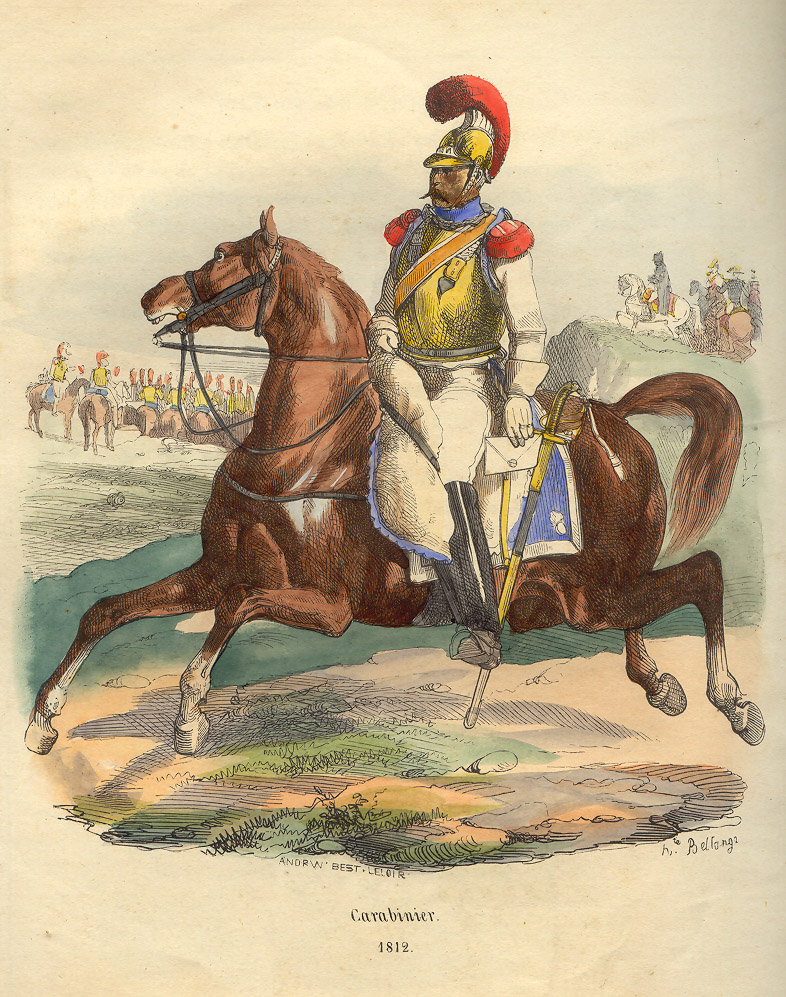
Horse carabinier as of 1809

The corps of Carabiniers was a group of heavy cavalry originally created by Louis XIV. From 1791 to 1809, their uniforms consisted of a blue coat with a blue piped red collar, red cuffs, lapels and turnbacks with white grenades, red epaulettes with edged white straps, red cuff flaps for the 1st Regiment, blue piped red for the 2nd; pewter buttons, a white waistcoat, buff breeches, high boots, a black bearskin cap, white cords, a red patch with a white cross, a red plume, metal white chin scales from 1809, yellow-buff edged white belts, white gauntlet gloves, blue cloaks, and white sheepskin edged red. They wore white long gaiters for service on foot and blue overalls for undress.

Regiment	Coats	Collars & Turnbacks	Cuffs	Cuff flaps
1st Carabiniers				
2nd Carabiniers				

=== Cuirassiers ===
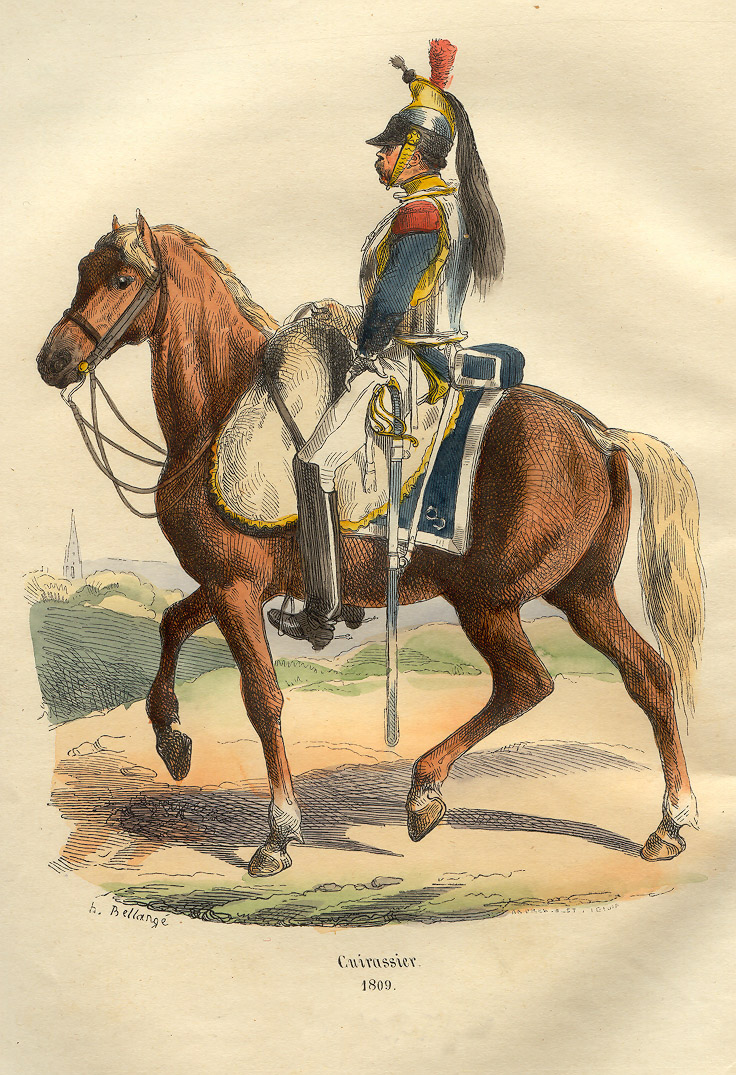
French Cuirassier

The Carabiniers wore the white uniform of the ancient regime with red epaulettes, blue cuffs and collar and blue turnback skirts embroidered with dark blue grenade badges that were replaced by white in 1808. From 1809 onwards the Carabiniers were issued with a cuirasses with a thin layer of brass covering the steel. By then the old uniform with a white, single-breasted tunic with blue collars, and turnbacks. To distinguish them, the cuffs were of different colors: red cuffs edged sky blue for the 1st and sky blue cuffs and flaps edged white for the 2nd regiment. The cuirassiers initially were issued with a blue coat with red epaulettes yellow collar, cuffs and turnback skirts. By 1809 a dark blue single-breasted tunic was introduced with red epaulettes for troopers and silver for officers. Collars cuffs and turnbacks were in different colors according to their regiment. They also were issued with cuirasses of polished steel.

Regiment	Coats	Collars & Turnbacks	Cuffs	Cuff flaps
1st Cuirassiers				
2nd Cuirassiers				
3rd Cuirassiers				
4th Cuirassiers				
5th Cuirassiers				
6th Cuirassiers				
7th Cuirassiers				
8th Cuirassiers				
9th Cuirassiers				
10th Cuirassiers				
11th Cuirassiers				
12th Cuirassiers				
13th Cuirassiers				
14th Cuirassiers				

=== Dragoons ===
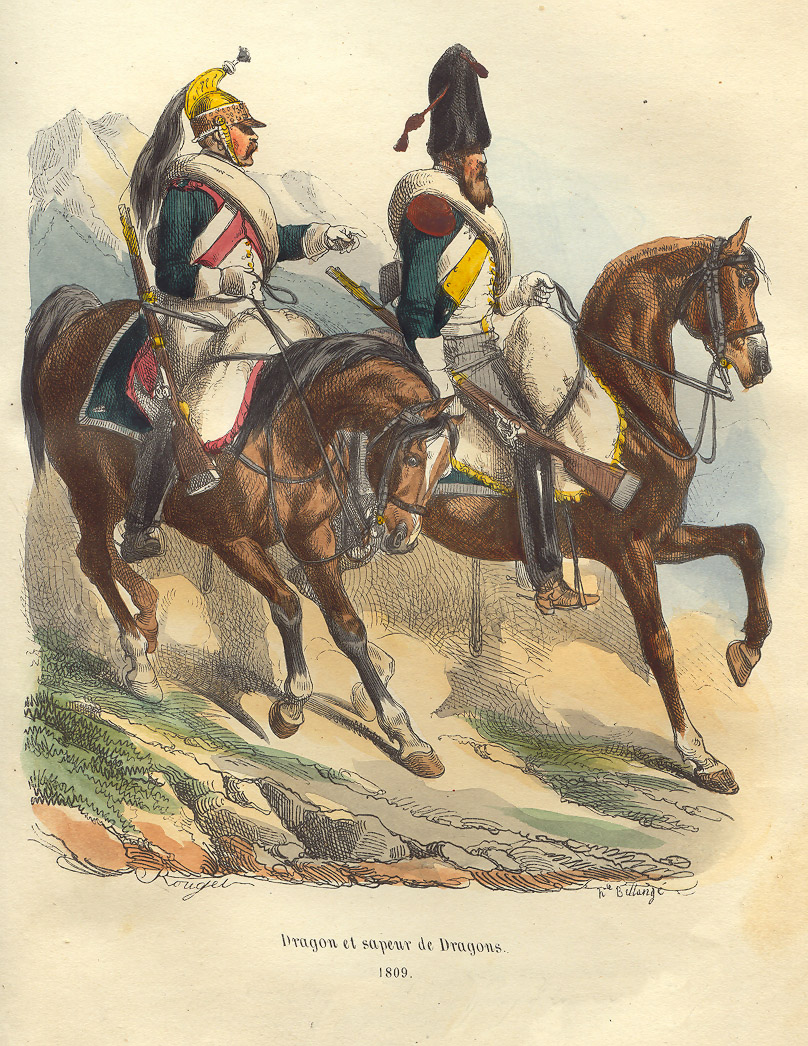
A Dragoon and a sapper of the dragoons of the line

The Dragoons were issued with a green coat, white trousers and white waistcoat. Regiments were distinguished by the color of the lapels cuffs and collar. While officers wore silver or golden epaulettes troopers only wore shoulder straps piped in the regimental color. When in 1812 the coat were replaced by a short jacket, groups of six regiments were each assigned a color. 1st to 6th Regiment were scarlet, 7th to 12th crimson, 13th to 18th rose, 19th to 24th yellow and 24th to 30th aurore.Each tunic had seven pewter buttons on each lapels embossed with the regimental number. The dragoons were also issued with a green single-breasted surtout. Sometimes it was decoreated with the regimental color. To protect their riding breeches, dragoons wore coarse grey or green trousers known as pantalons. They were often made of unbleached fabric with similarly colored cloth-covered buttons along the length of the outside of the leg and regimental coloured piping or lace.

Regiment	Coats	Collars	Turnbacks	Cuffs	Cuff flaps
1st Dragoons					
2nd Dragoons					
3rd Dragoons					
4th Dragoons					
5th Dragoons					
6th Dragoons					
7th Dragoons					
8th Dragoons					
9th Dragoons					
10th Dragoons					
11th Dragoons					
12th Dragoons					
13th Dragoons					
14th Dragoons					
15th Dragoons					
16th Dragoons					
17th Dragoons					
18th Dragoons					
19th Dragoons					
20th Dragoons					
21st Dragoons					
22nd Dragoons					
23rd Dragoons					
24th Dragoons					
25th Dragoons					
26th Dragoons					
27th Dragoons					
28th Dragoons					
29th Dragoons					
30th Dragoons					

=== Chevaux-légers lanciers ===
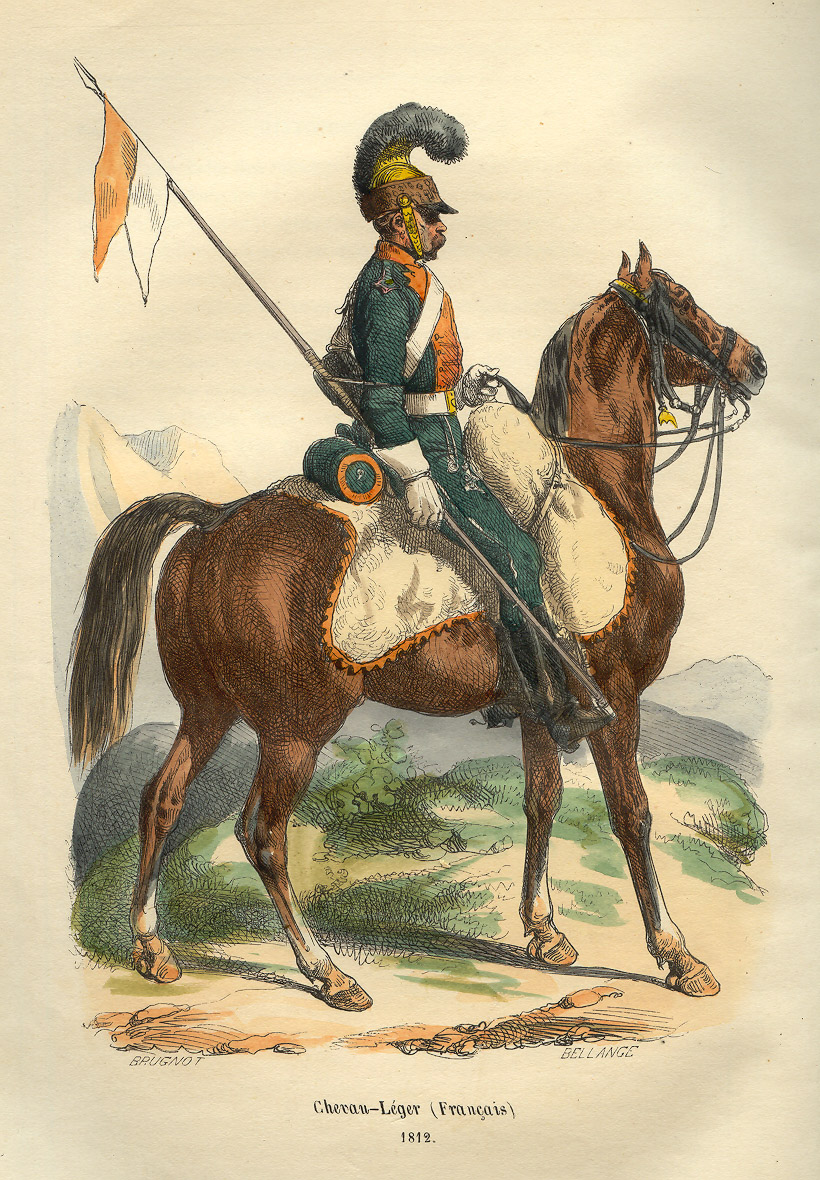
2nd Chevaux-légere of the line

The uniform of the light cavalry (or Chevaux-légers) of the line consisted of a green coat with turnbacks and lapels of the regimental facing color, which could be crimson, red, blue, pink or yellow. The collar and cuffs were of the facings color, the green shoulder straps and the breeches were piped with the facing color. The uniform comprised pewter buttons, black boots, a brass helmet with a brass crest supporting a woolen crest named chenille (caterpillar, in French), a sealskin turban, black leather visor, brass chin scales and red epaulettes for elite companies.

Regiment	Coats	Facings
1st Chevaux-légers		
2nd Chevaux-légers		
3rd Chevaux-légers		
4th Chevaux-légers		
5th Chevaux-légers		
6th Chevaux-légers		

=== Hussars ===
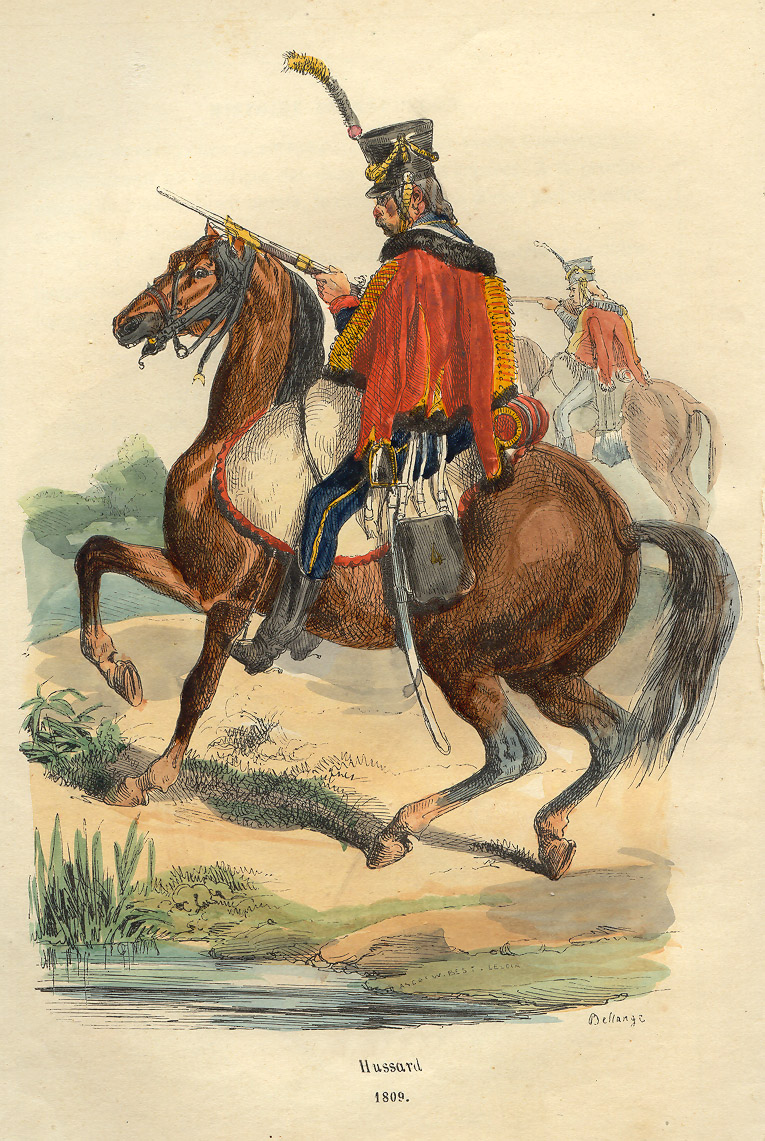
Hussar of the 4th regiment

The hussars uniform consisted of a short shell-jacket, the dolman in the color according to their regiment. Hussars wore also a second jacket slung on the left shoulder the pelisse. In Winter the pelisse were worn over the dolman. Whilst the dolman could be fastened completely using eighteen semi-circular buttons and their corresponding lacing loops, the pelisse could only be fastened using the top five laces. As a rule, both garments were fitted with a five-button placket; the only exceptions were the Second, Fourth, Fifth, Ninth and Tenth Regiments, whose uniforms had a three-button placket.

A double-layered cord was used to secure the pelisse on the shoulder; this ran across the right-hand side and was fastened to a toggle on the opposite side of the neck. In day-to-day service, soldiers combined the dolman or pelisse with a sleeveless, single- or double-breasted waistcoat worn underneath, often featuring further embellishments. For fatigue or stable duty, there was also a dark green linen jacket, which was likewise fastened with a single or double row of buttons and featured loop fastenings in places. From 1812 onwards, a narrow lace was attached to the left shoulder of the dolman and pelisse to hold the webbing in place. The waistcoat was single-breasted, with ten fabric-covered buttons. Officers did not wear epaulettes; instead, their rank was indicated by gold chevrons on the cuffs, the thighs and the shako.

The riding breeches were in the close-fitting Hungarian style and featured decorative elements such as bow designs, trefoil patterns or Hungarian knots on the outer sides and on the front fly, which concealed the buttons.To protect the valuable breeches from premature wear and tear, overalls made of canvas were worn. These overalls were made in blue, grey, green or red and could be opened along the sides using eighteen bone or pewter buttons. To increase their durability, they featured leather reinforcements on the insides and at the hems. From 1812 onwards, dark green overtrousers with eighteen dark-coloured bone buttons and leather trim became the official standard. Some variants made it easier to put them on over riding boots thanks to calf buttons, whilst other designs adapted the leather trim to match the shape of the boot shaft.

An oversized cape, large enough to envelop both the rider and his horse, served as protection against the weather. Due to its unwieldiness, this cape was later replaced by a capote. This greatcoat featured an integrated shoulder cape and had the advantage that the girth system could be fastened over it. Both the cape and the capote were dark green. Officers wore similar styles of coat, but when on foot they generally opted for a double-breasted overcoat.

Regiment	Pelisse	Dolman	Breeches	Facings	Lace
1st Hussars					
2nd Hussars					
3rd Hussars					
4th Hussars					
5th Hussars					
6th Hussars					
7th Hussars					
8th Hussars					
9th Hussars					
10th Hussars					
11th Hussars					
12th Hussars					
13th Hussars					

=== Horse Chasseurs ===
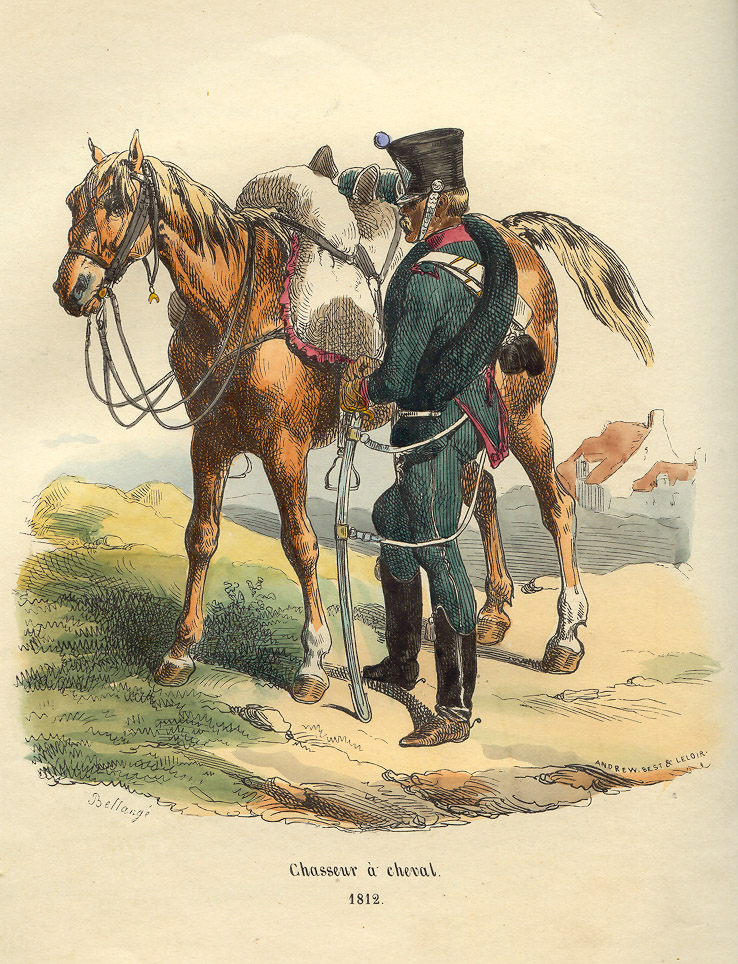
Chasseur à cheval

Until about 1805, all regiments wore the dolman, at least for full dress. This dolman featured three rows of pewter buttons and thirteen to eighteen rows of braid, and was richly trimmed with white braid along the seams, the collar, and the lapels. Officers wore the dolman with five rows of buttons and silver braid, sometimes complemented by a pelisse. From 1806 onward, the dolman was replaced by the conventional coat with turnbacks in the regimental color and usually embroidered with a green hunting horn. Unlike the dolman, this coat had no white braid on the collar and lapels; instead, it was piped in the opposite color. Officers’ ranks were indicated by epaulettes.

Beginning in 1808, the Kinski, a single-breasted coatee, appeared; it was fastened with nine pewter buttons and piped along the chest in the regimental color. By 1813, another coatee similar to the Kinski followed, but with additional flaps. Under their coats, the hunters wore sleeveless vests, which were officially supposed to be white in summer and green in winter, although before 1812 many unofficial, sometimes double-breasted variants in scarlet or other colors were worn. For stable duty, the enlisted men had a short, green stable jacket at their disposal.

Regiment	Coats	Collars	Turnbacks & Cuffs
1st Regiment			
2nd Regiment			
3rd Regiment			
4th Regiment			
5th Regiment			
6th Regiment			
7th Regiment			
8th Regiment			
9th Regiment			
10th Regiment			
11th Regiment			
12th Regiment			
13th Regiment			
14th Regiment			
15th Regiment			
16th Regiment			
17th Regiment			
18th Regiment			
19th Regiment			
20th Regiment			
21st Regiment			
22nd Regiment			
23rd Regiment			
24th Regiment			
25th Regiment			
26th Regiment			
27th Regiment			
28th Regiment			
29th Regiment			
30th Regiment			
31st Regiment			

== Artillery ==
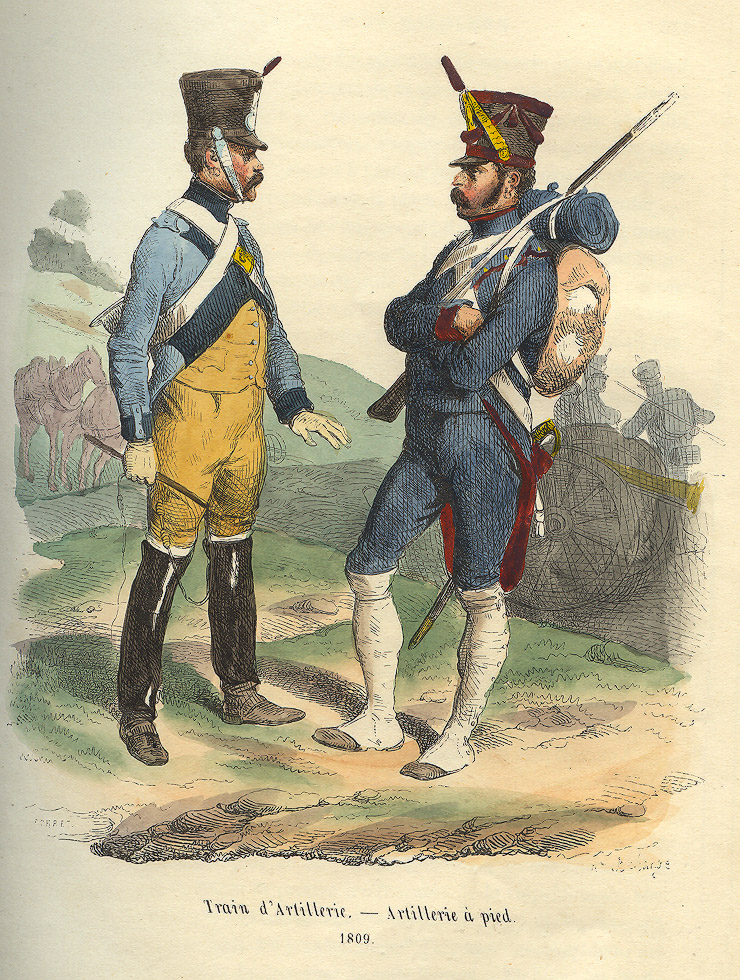
Soldier of the train and foot artillerist of the line

The foot artillery retained the traditional dark blue coat, faced red with brass buttons, while the horse artillery wore a dark blue surtout alongside a red-laced, hussar-style waistcoat and dark blue breeches with red lace and piping. As undress uniform, an almost identical coat of the Mounted Chasseurs, contrasting with their rich blue hussar full dress uniform, was worn. The artillery train wore iron grey uniforms and buff small clothes with a blue collar, lapels, cuffs, and turnbacks piped red, secured with white buttons and bolts, and completed with red epaulettes.

== Imperial Guard ==
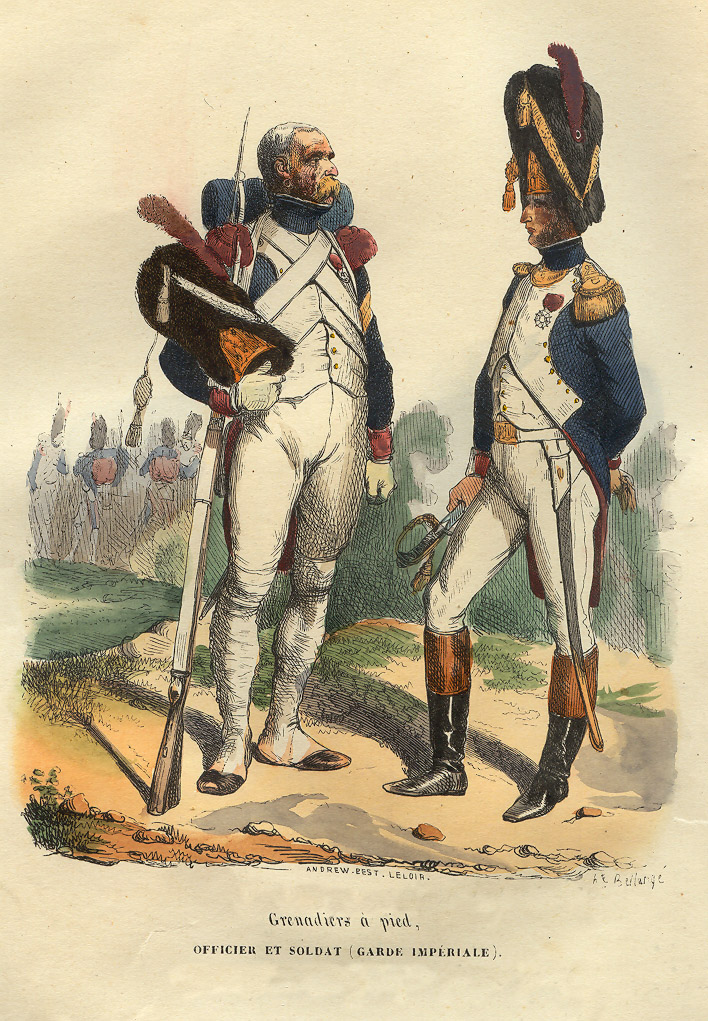
Grenadiers of the Imperial Guard (private and officer)

=== Infantry ===
==== Grenadiers ====
At first, grenadiers were issued with two coats: one for full dress and one for undress. In 1802, the surtout replaced the second coat as the undress. The blue coat was lined with scarlet, had scarlet turnbacks and cuffs, and featured a three-pointed white flap. The vertical pockets were piped in scarlet, and the epaulette loops were white with a scarlet lining. The turnbacks were embroidered with aurore grenades on a white, shaped patch. Scarlet epaulettes were worn on both shoulders and were lined in white. The lapeless surtout was identical of the coat but with blue collar and cuffs. The coat worn by the Velites had pointed shoulder straps and blue piping, instead of epaulettes. From 1806, the standard grenadier cuff flap became the norm. Initially, the coat featured yellow brass buttons, which were later replaced by copper buttons. Rank was indicated by chevrons and epaulettes.

Corporals wore two aurore chevrons piped in scarlet. Sergeant majors wore gold epaulettes adorned with mixed scarlet and gold fringes and gold half-moons. The fringes comprised two or three layers, with the top layer being gold and the layer underneath being scarlet. After 1806, a third gold layer was added to the outer layer for sergeant majors. Until 1806, sergeants had gold half-moons and scarlet fringes, and after that, they had scarlet fringes covered by a layer of gold. All NCO straps had scarlet lace running along their length, edged by gold. The underside was lined with scarlet. The loops were gold and lined with scarlet. One or two gold lace stripes, piped scarlet, appeared on each arm. Quartermasters wore the aurore chevrons of corporals on each arm, as well as a gold-laced chevron on each upper arm with the lower point facing forwards, and epaulettes like a sergeant's. The turnback grenades for NCOs and quartermasters were gold on a white patch, as were the buttons.

The coat worn by the officers was identically cut, with gold buttons and grenades, but made of a finer material. Depending on their rank, they wore gold epaulettes. They also wore a gilt gorget plate around their neck when on duty, attached by gold cords to the top lapel buttons. This was usually decorated with a crowned eagle or a silver grenade. Officers had a surtout with piping of scarlet on the front of the coat and lower edges, and sometimes on the collar as well. Both coats were worn with a cravat or neck collar. The cravat was white for parades and black for all other situations.

A white or blue sleeveless single-breasted waistcoat was worn beneath both types of coat. The waistcoat was closed down the front with 12 small uniform buttons. In some cases, shoulder straps were attached, while in others, a white epaulette loop was visible on each shoulder. For certain tasks, a white smock was worn. When on march or in winter a plain blue greatcoat was worn. By 1812, a scarlet patch with a white edge and a small button was attached on each side of the collar. The cuffs were also piped scarlet. Except for blue scarlet piped shoulder straps and turnbacks embroided with white eagles the coat for Fusilier Grenadiers was the same as for the Foot Grenadiers. Rank insignia were also the same. By 1809 epaulettes with green straps and scarlet half moons and fringes were introduced.

==== Chasseurs ====
Apart from the white lapels and scarlet cuffs that were pointed instead of square both the chasseurs and grenadiers wore the same coat. The white-piped cuffs fastened with two buttons, one above and one on the cuff itself. While the turnbacks and pockets were the same as those of the grenadiers, the turnback insignia consisted of two aurore horns and two grenades on white patches. Corporals wore two inverted aurore chevrons, edged in scarlet while sergeants had a single gold-edged, scarlet-lined inverted chevron above each cuff. The green epaulette straps were edged with gold and lined with scarlet. The half-moons were gold. The fringes were made up of one row of red, covered by one row of gold. The securing strap was gold and lined with scarlet. Sergeant majors wore two gold chevrons edged with scarlet, with epaulettes similar to those of sergeants. From 1806 onwards, sergeant majors had two gold stripes outside the red fringe.

Quartermasters were distinguished by two aurore chevrons piped in scarlet above the cuffs and a gold laced chevron on each upper arm. They wore the same epaulettes as the sergeants. The buttons and turnback insignia were gold both for NCOs and Quartermasters. Officers had gilt buttons and gold epaulettes. The Chasseurs, surtout was identical to that of the Grenadiers expect for plain pointed cuffs in place of squared and the use of the horns instead of grenades on the turnbacks. Only NCOs were issued with a waistcoat identical to that of the Grenadiers. The overcoat was the same as for the Grenadiers, but it did not have a coloured patch. Scarlet piping appeared around the collar and cuffs in 1813. The epaulette loops on the overcoat were initially green, then scarlet in 1814 blue to match the coat.

==== Tirailleur Chasseurs and Grenadiers ====
The uniform of the Tirailleurs Chasseurs was identical to that worn by the Tirailleurs Grenadiers, featuring a blue coat with pointed lapels and pointed cuffs. The turnback skirts were much shorter than those used by previous regiments. The coat had a red collar piped with blue, blue pointed lapels piped white, and vertical pockets outlined with white piping. While the buttons on the coat were brass and all ranks carried steel grey overcoats, with those of the officers being identical to the overcoats of the Fusiliers Grenadiers, the specific regimental distinctions for the Tirailleurs Chasseurs appeared on the pointed shoulder straps, which were green with red, or sometimes white, piping rather than the solid red with white piping worn by the Grenadiers. The red pointed cuffs were edged with white piping, but the Tirailleurs Chasseurs were distinguished by their turnback ornaments; instead of the standard white eagles, their decorations consisted of green eagles on the two outermost turnbacks and green hunting horns on the two innermost.

Waistcoats and breeches were white with short, below-the-knee gaiters that featured brass buttons, though white or blue trousers were substituted when on service and in tenue de route. Rank distinctions were also similarly across both regiments, with corporals being distinguished by two aurore-coloured inverted chevrons above each cuff. Sergeants and sergeant majors wore one or two gold lace inverted chevrons above each cuff, respectively. Additionally, the sous officers wore epaulettes with white shoulder straps carrying two thin gold lines and gold half moons, but the fringes for the Chasseur NCOs were mixed green and gold rather than white and gold worn by their Grenadier counterparts.

==== Marines ====
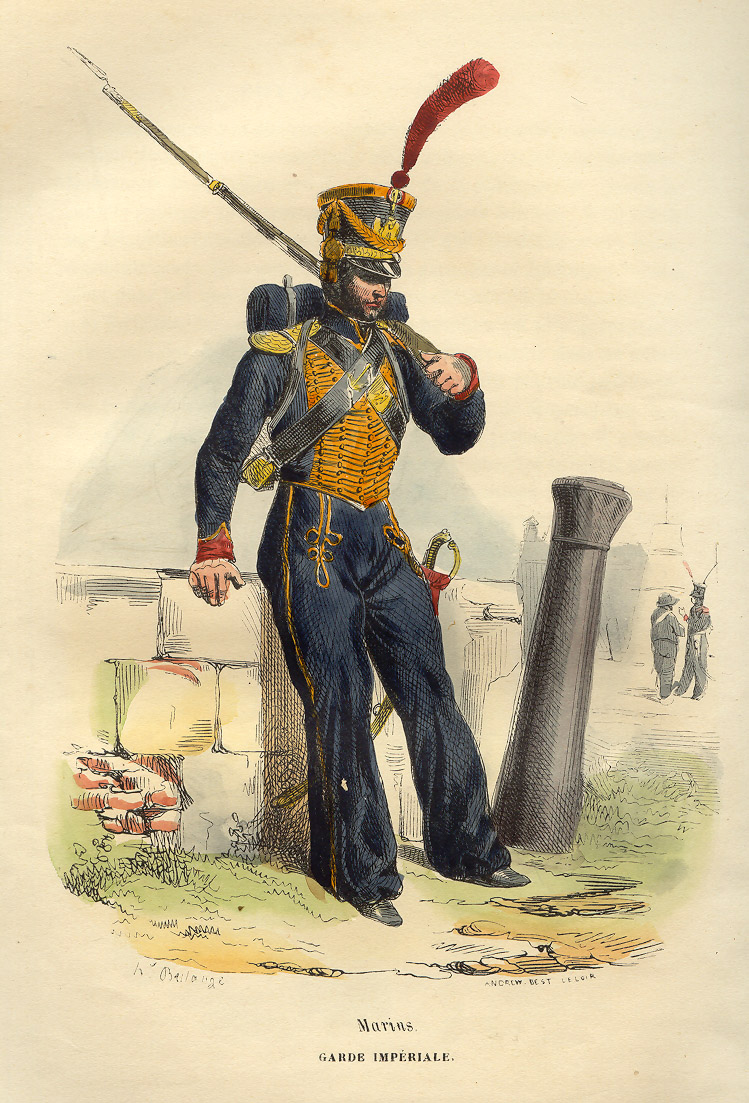
Marine of the Guard

Marines wore a blue coat called paletot (identical to a Hussar dolman). The coat had a blue collar piped with aurore. The pointed cuffs were scarlet, laced aurore for men, while NCOs had mixed scarlet and gold. Lace and piping also adorned both sides of the coat, forming a double spearhead. The coat featured fifteen horizontal rows of double braid, embroidered with trefoils or crows feet aurore for the men and corporals and mixed scarlet and gold for NCOs. Brass scale shoulder straps were worn on a scarlet lining. The buttons initially carried an anchor with a bundle of rods superimposed. As part of the Garde Imperial a crowned eagle appeared.

The waistcoat was scarlet with three rows of fifteen brass or gold buttons. For undress a blue blouse were issued. It featured a blue collar and pointed cuffs laced aurore. For full dress, black leather boots were worn. For undress, shoes were worn with grey or black gaiters in winter and white gaiters in summer. A blue double-breasted greatcoat were also issued.

=== Cavalry ===
==== Heavy Cavalry ====
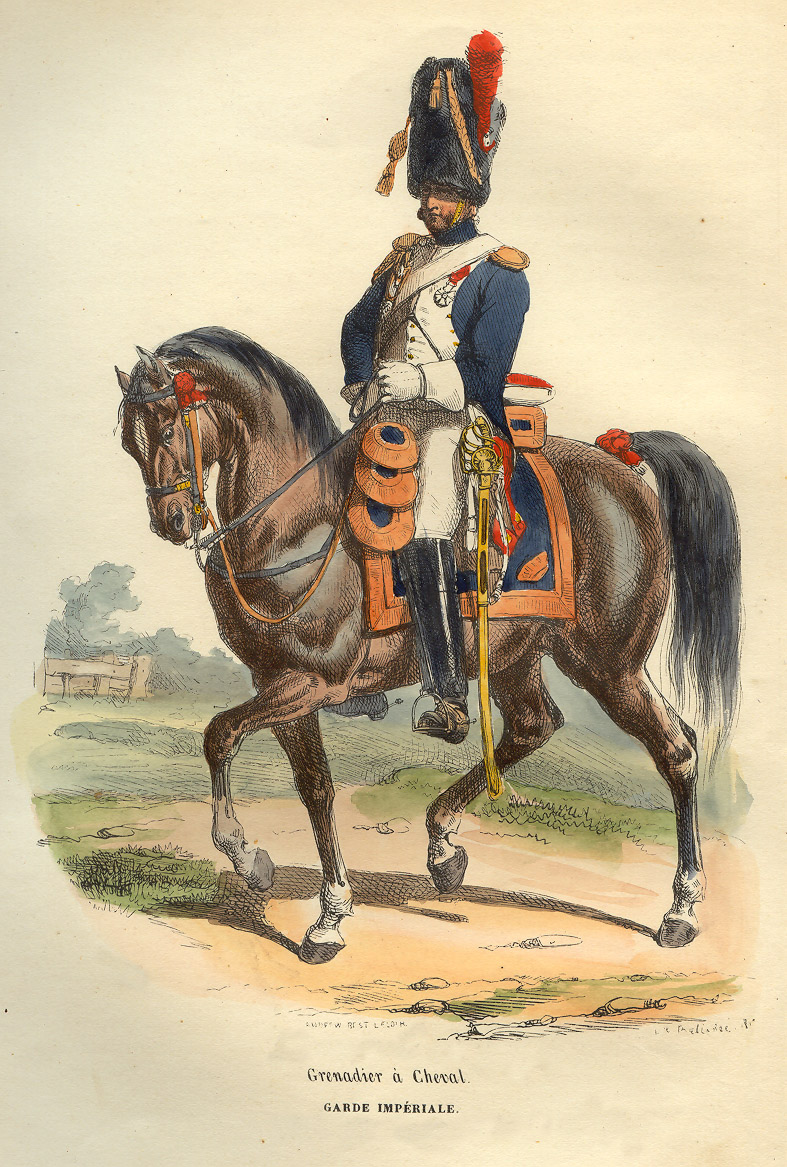
Horse grenadier

The uniform of the heavy cavalry consisted of a blue tunic with brass buttons coined with the imperial eagle. The cuffs were scarlet and the turnback skirts had white lapels. The turnbacks were embroided with aurore grenades. Initially they wore trefoil epaulettes that were replaced b aurore fringkess epualettes. On the right shoulder the also wore an aurore aiguilette. In order to save the coat a surtout with rounded dark blue cuffs were worn. Until 1808 the surtout had seven copper buttons after that date it had ten. The epaulettes and aiguilettes were the same as for the coat. For fatigues and off duty the grenadiers wore the dark blue stable jacket.

Initially, the grenadiers were issued the cavalry cape (Manteau trois-quarts), which was made of white fabric with a slight hint of sky blue. The collar was dark blue, and the front opening as well as the back slit were lined on both sides with scarlet serge. From 1813 onward, the grenadiers received a sleeved coat (Manteaucapote) to which a short shoulder cape was attached. It was the same color as before, but was decorated with a strip of dark blue braid on the shoulder cape and all other outer edges. Further decoration consisted of Aurore lace with a fringed tassel around the three uniform buttons on the shoulder hood. The coat itself was fastened with six fabric-covered buttons. When in full dress they wore deerskin breeches while in undress or other duties they wore breeches made from sheep-leather. When on march white canvass overalls were worn in order to save the riding breeches. By 1813 these overalls had become grey. For stable duty, overalls of rough, undyed cloth were adopted.

==== Medium Cavalry ====
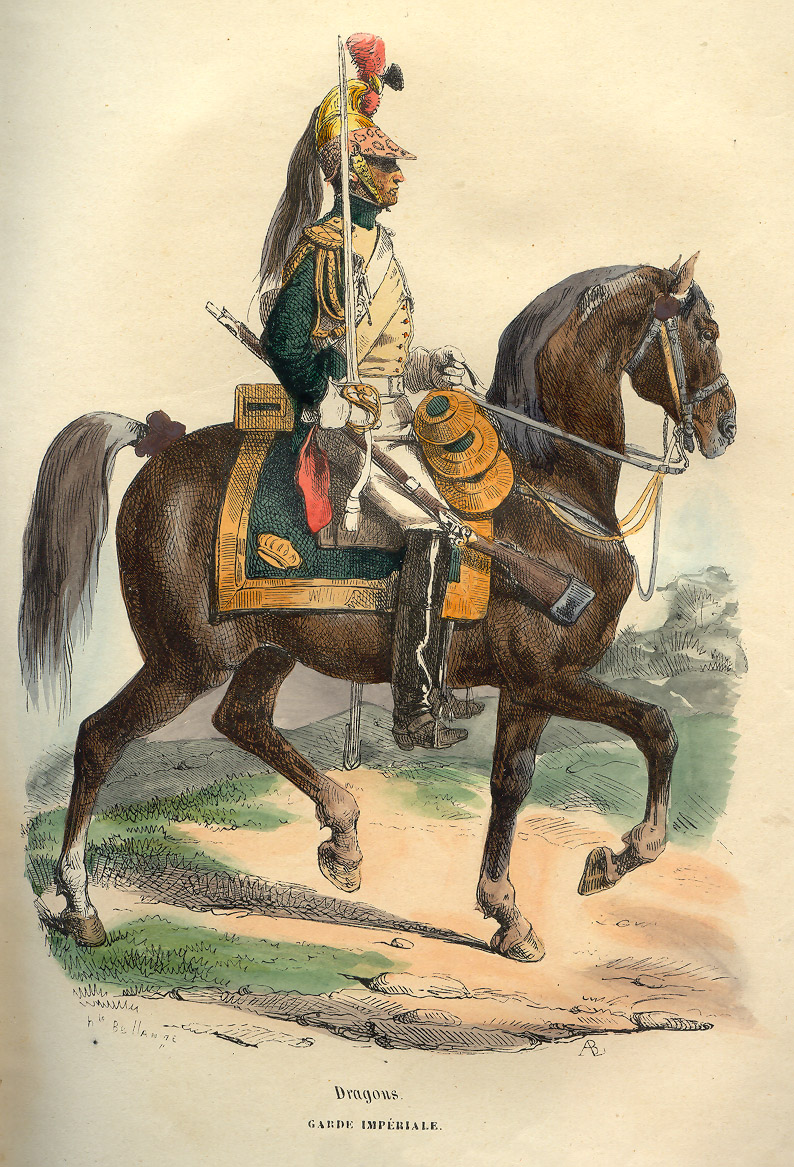
Empress Dragoon

The full-dress tunic was of a dark green cloth, with dark green collar, white lapels and cuff-slashes, and scarlet cuffs and turnbacks. The skirt of the uniform featured false pockets with scarlet piping, while the flaps were embroidered with Aurore grenade insignia on white linen backing, fastened with copper buttons. On both shoulders were fringeless aurore epaulettes, with an additional aurore aiguillette on the right side. For daily service, dragoons wore the surtout, a single-breasted coat in a similar cut as those of the Grenadiers' uniform. It had a green collar and green cuffs alongside copper buttons, Its simulated pockets, turnbacks and epaulettes were identical to the full-dress tunic. By 1809, it was replaced by a coatee, which was often still referred as surtout, which was identical to the full-dress tunic but made from cheaper cloth.

==== Light Cavalry ====
Like the ordinary hussars they wore a green dolman with green collar, scarlet cuffs and aurore lace and braid. The scarlet pelisse was trimmed with curly black fur and lined with white flannel. The arrangement of the copper buttons, as well as the lace and braids, were the same as those of the dolman. The garment was fastened at the shoulder with an aurore lace and a toggle at the collar. When worn normally, only the top four buttons could be fastened; the loops for the remaining buttons were shorter and served merely as decoration.

The coat was of green cloth, with a green collar and cuffs, lapels and turnbacks, all piped in scarlet. The turnbacks were embroidered with aurore hunting-horns on a scarlet patch. The left shoulder carried an aurore aiguillette fixed with two brass needles, while the right had a simple aurore trefoil epaulette mounted on green cloth. The buttons were copper. The stable jacket was cut entirely of green cloth, double-breasted, with twin rows of ten copper buttons. They were issued breeches of yellow deerskin for full dress and green breeches for undress both were of identical cut. The green breeches were ornamented along the outer seams by a band of aurore lace, describing Hungarian knots.

Regiment	Coats	Collars	Turnbacks & Cuffs
1st Regiment			

==== Lancers (or chevaux-légers) ====
For parade, the Polish Lancers' uniform consisted of dark blue kurtkas, amaranth lapels and facings. They wore a singular epaulette and a white aiguillette was adorned across their shoulders. Their headgear was the iconic Czapka which was mainly amaranth with white cords and a white plume. The Sun-Burst Plate bore an "N" for Napoleon.

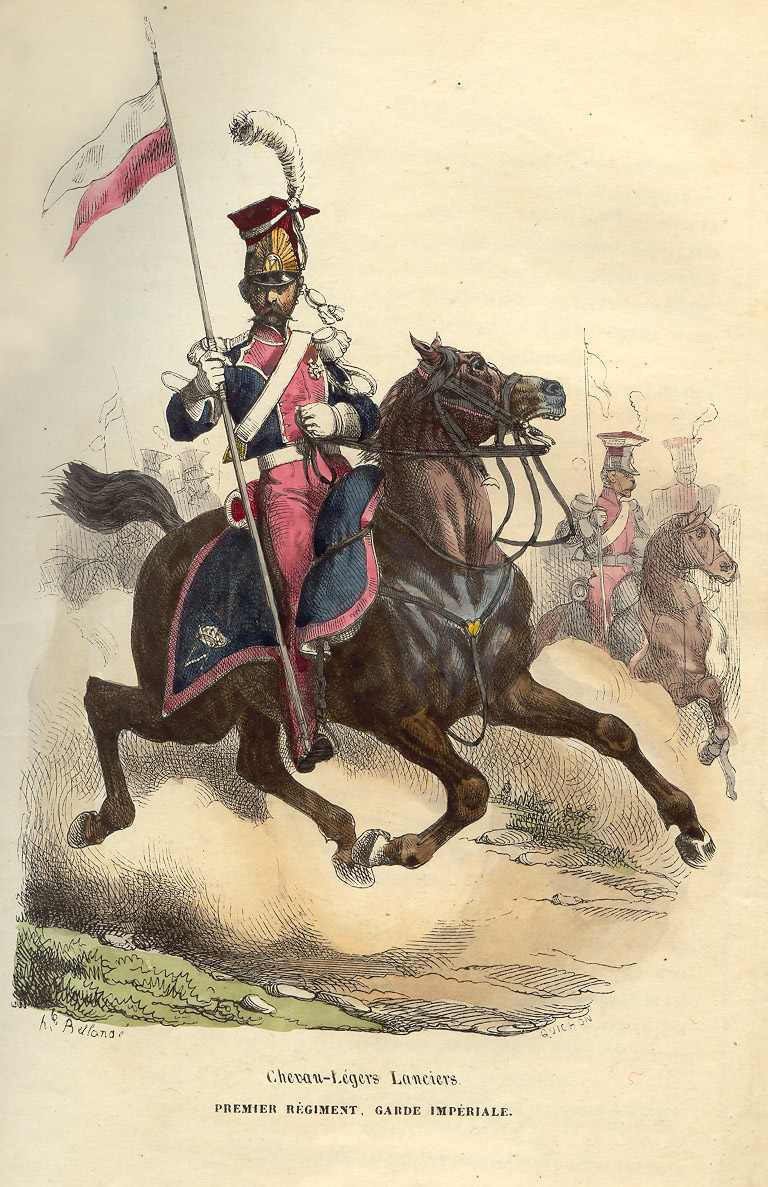
Polish lancer of the Imperial Guard

==== Mamelukes ====
Regular clothing included the banish, a robe with wide sleeves, which was replaced around 1808 by narrower sleeves of European cut. Underneath, the mantanna was worn, a type of Greek tunic with sleeves, as well as sleeveless vests such as the fermelet or the yalek. The Yalek was a long-sleeved, collarless shirt worn under a short-sleeved vest called the Beniche. By 1812, both the Yalek and the coat received sleeves. These various garments could be made of different types of fabric and in different colors. In addition, the Mamelukes were issued a gray greatcoat.

Legwear consisted of loose-fitting Turkish trousers called sharual or charoual, usually in carmine red, amaranth red, or white. The boots were made of leather in various colors and initially had no spurs; these were not introduced until 1809, with the recruitment of non-Oriental Mamelukes. For officers and NCOs, a blue uniform with carmine-red insignia was introduced in 1804, modeled after the coat of the mounted Chasseurs, with the turnbacks decorated with crescents. A single-breasted carmine-red vest was worn underneath. The trousers were blue and in the Hungarian style. With this uniform, officers received a pelisse with gold trim and non-commissioned officers a version with yellow trim, along with riding breeches lined with sheepskin and crimson lapasses. Non-commissioned officers also wore gold-and-blue shoulder cords.

==== Elite Gendarmes ====
Elite Gendarmes were issued a blue coat similar to that of the Grenadiers. The coat had a blue collar scarlet lapels, facings and scarlet turnbacks embroidered with blue grenades. The buttons were of with metal with the eagle of the Guard. The coat featured trefoil shoulder flaps on the right and a braided white aglet on the left.

The greatcoat was blue cloth and featured five buttons with straight facings and scarlet piping of the collar, front edges, lining, and turnbacks. Full dress breeches were made from buckskin, while an additional pair intended for everyday wear was made from sheepskin. Both types of breeches were yellow ochre. To save the breeches ecru cloth overtrouser with side fastenings were worn over the breeches when on march or campaign. Blue cloth breeches were worn for quarters dress and town dress. The cape was blue and had three white braid buttonholes. For stable duty a jacket with two rows of cloth buttons and a pair of fatigue trousers were worn.

== Headress ==
=== Infantry ===
The headdress for men and officers was the bicorne. It was worn either en bataille (crossways for battle) with a spherical pom-pon of company colour above a tricolour cockade, or en colonne (fore and aft for marching), where the cockade was secured by a yellow lace strip attached to a tunic button. Officers often added golden tassels to the ends, retaining the bicorne for off-duty wear even after newer models were introduced. A fatigue cap with golden piping served as undress headgear for officers. For better protection against weather and cavalry sabres, the shako was introduced by 1806/07. Constructed of felt, it was reinforced with leather bands at the top and bottom, featuring V-shaped side chevrons, a sturdy peak, and an adjustable rear buckle.

The front displayed a copper regimental plate below a tricolour cockade, topped by a company-coloured pom-pon in round, flat, or carrot-shaped geometries. For formal occasions, the shako was embellished with cords and tassels, which were removed during campaigns. Elite companies like voltigeurs and grenadiers maintained specific variations, with red bands, plumes, or distinct chevron colours for grenadiers and yellow/green bands, plumes or distinct chevron colours for voltigeurs. By 1811, a new, slightly higher and more bell-topped shako was issued. This variant had no side chevrons, but chin-scales, and featured a built-in leather flap or couvre-nuque stitched into the headband. This flap remained folded inside when not in use but could be lowered to protect the ears and neck during inclement weather. The regimental plates had either a diamond shape or an eagle resting on a semi-circle.

=== Light Infantry ===
Initially, regulations specified a fur-crested tarleton helmet for chasseurs, constructed with a black leather skull and peak reinforced by metal side bands. It featured a tricolour cockade adopted on May 27, 1790, and an imitation fur band and crest. For full dress, this helmet was adorned with white plumes with a facing-coloured tip, which were replaced by similarly coloured pompons for ordinary wear. Due to its unpopularity, a standard bicorn hat was widely preferred as an alternative by both officers and other ranks. During this same early period, the carabiniers wore a distinct fur cap modeled after that of the Line grenadiers but distinguished by being shorter measures and by the complete absence of a frontal plate.

The introduction of the 1801 shako brought a standardized cap to the light infantry. This shako, which closely resembled the older mirliton cap but without its cloth wing, widened only slightly toward the top. It was constructed of black felt with leather upper and lower bands and a detachable peak fastened a short way up the body by hooks and eyes, though some regiments, like the 1st Léger, used versions made entirely of leather. It featured a front brass badge shaped like a hunting horn, a tricolour cockade secured on the left side by a loop of yellow or orange lace with two buttons, green cords with pendent 'raquettes' suspended around the cap, and a left-side drooping plume, which was dark green for chasseurs and scarlet for carabiniers.

Carabinier shakos were sometimes further customized with scarlet upper and lower bands, scarlet or white cords, and a shako plate showing a hunting horn surmounted by a grenade. For full dress, however, carabiniers often retained their fur cap, worn without a plate but enhanced with a red plume, red or white cords, and a rear patch officially quartered red and blue with a white lace cross. Because front plates were often omitted, regiments seeking individuality frequently turned the cap around to display the plume and cockade at the front.

Officers' headdress was generally similar to the other ranks but were distinguished by silver plates, cords, and lace. The upper band of an officer's shako had silver laurel leaves or interlocking rings embroidered onto a black velvet backing, with cockades and plumes often fixed to the front. Officers' busbies and carabinier caps were heavily ornamented with silver, and they commonly substituted the shako with a bicorn hat. On campaign, this bicorn was worn alongside a single-breasted dark blue surtout. By the rank of sergeant and above, non-commissioned officers also incorporated shako cords intermixed with silver lace.

The first major change of the Empire period came with the 1806 shako, made of felt with black leather upper and lower bands, and occasionally a leather chevron on each side. Initially issued without chinscales, soldiers frequently added unofficial white metal chinscales with circular bosses displaying a hunting horn, or a grenade for carabiniers. The front of the 1806 shako featured a tricolour cockade above a diamond-shaped white metal plate embossed with an eagle and the regimental number, or other insignia. These plumes were shifted to an upright style, though older drooping types persisted until around 1807. These plumes were red for carabiniers, green or green with a red tip for chasseurs, and green and yellow or yellow and red for voltigeurs.

They could often replaced by similarly colored pompons, sometimes adorned with tufts. Shako cords remained red for carabiniers and were usually white for the other companies, as chasseurs rarely wore their earlier green cords. On campaign, these shakos were routinely covered with oilskin or linen protective covers. By 1810 another shako was introduced. It was slightly taller and more robust had no side chevrons, but chinscales. While cords and plumes were officially abolished, other ranks continued to wear colored pompons as before, while officers wore rank-specific plumes: white for colonels, red-over-white for majors, and red for a chef de bataillon, alongside rank-dependent shako lace. The official 1810 shako plate consisted of a white metal diamond bearing an embossed hunting horn or a grenade with the regimental number inside the loop.

=== Cavalry ===
By 1804, the Cuirassiers replaced the old bicorn with an steel helmet featuring a black fur turban extending over a brass-edged peak, a copper comb, and a flowing black horsehair crest, secured by brass chin scales and accented with a red plume on the left. The Carabiniers, who had adopted a bearskin cap in 1801 distinguished by a red top patch decorated with a white cross and a red plume on the left, were issued a yellow copper helmet complete with a red crest, copper comb, front and rear peaks, steel chin scales, and a steel front plate.

Introduced in 1804, the Dragoon helmet was constructed entirely of brass, featuring chin scales, a high comb, a flowing black horsehair crest, and a fur turban extending down over the peak. For parades, a plume was added to the left side, following highly specific regimental color codes ranging from solid red, white, or crimson to various bi-color combinations. The Lancers similarly wore a brass helmet, but with distinct front and rear peaks. Their comb was adorned with a Medusa's head over crossed lances on the front, supporting a black crest in a caterpillar form. While troopers wore brown fur turbans that did not cover the black, brass-edged peak, officers were distinguished by turbans made of leopardskin extending over the front.

The light cavalry, including the mounted Chasseurs and Hussars, relied primarily on the shako. The Chasseurs began introducing it in 1805, featuring a tricolour cockade, a regimental loop and button, and varying front plates. White chin scales were standard, with white cords added for ceremonial duties, and dark green plumes were typically tipped in the regimental facing color. For off-duty wear, they used a dark green fatigue cap (bonnet de police) trimmed in the facing color and marked with a white tassel alongside a hunting horn or regimental number.

The shako for hussars was fitted with a regimental button, loop, and tricolour cockade. Its peak was edged in the button color, and the chin scales were complemented by cords secured at the sides by hooks set into five-pointed stars. At the top, a pom-pon showed the squadron (sky blue for the second, dark yellow for the third, and violet for the fourth), while a plume was added for parades. Elite companies of the first hussar squadron stood out by wearing bearskin colpacks with a red bag, red pom-pon, plume, and cords, until a tall, cylindrical model came into general service across the hussar regiments in 1813.

The Mamluks’ headgear initially consisted of either the cahuk, a type of green, yellow, or red cap, or the tarbush, a flat, always red cap. Both styles were wrapped at the base with a shal, a white cotton turban. There was also a variant of the cahuk with side panels and an open crown, which was sometimes adorned with a brass crescent. Beginning in 1806, the cahuk replaced the tarbush, which was thereafter worn only with the dress uniform. By 1815, it had taken the form of a red shako without a visor. Its front was adorned with a tricolor cockade or a star above a crescent moon and featured a double tassel or pompon. A matching protective cover was also available for this further-developed cahuk. Around 1809, the Mamelukes were also issued a blue field cap featuring white and carmine-red piping and a stripe decorated with a crescent moon.

== Bibliography ==
- Bukhari, Emir (1985). Napoleon´s Marshals. London: Osprey Publishing. ISBN 0-85045-305-4.
- Bukhari, Emir (1992). Napoleon´s Dragoons and Lancers. London: Osprey Publishing. ISBN 0-85045-088-8.
- Bukhari, Emir (1984a). Napoleon´s Hussars. London: Osprey Publishing. ISBN 0-85045-246-5.
- Bukhari, Emir (1984b). Napoleon´s line Chasseurs. Oxford: Osprey Publishing. ISBN 0-85045-269-4.
- Bukhari, Emir (1978). Napoleon´s Guard Cavalry. London: Osprey Publishing. ISBN 0-85045-288-0.
- Bukhari, Emir (1979). Napoleon´s Marshalls. London: Osprey Publishing. ISBN 0-85045-305-4.
- Bukhari, Emir (1973). French Napoleonic Line Infantry 1796-1815. London: Almark Publishing.
- Dempsey, Guy C. (1994). Napoleon's soldiers : the Grande Armée of 1807 as depicted in the Paintings of the Otto Manuscript. London: Arms and Armour Press. ISBN 1-85409-242-1.
- Haythornthwaite, Philip J. (1997). Napoleon´s Light Infantry. London: Osprey Publishing. ISBN 0-850-45-521-9.
- Head, Michael (1973). Foot Regiments of the Imperial Guard. New Malden: Almark Publishing. ISBN 0-855-24088-1.
- Jouineau, André; Mongin, Jean-Marie (2003). The Foot Soldiers. Officers and Soldiers of the French Imperial Guard 1804-1815. Vol. I. Histoire & Collections. ISBN 2-913903-45-2.
- Jouineau, André (2006). Cavalry 1804-1815: Mamelukes Chevau-Légers and Gendarmes d´Elite Regiments. Officers and Soldiers of the French Imperial Guard 1804-1815. Vol. III. Histoire & Collections. ISBN 2-913903-98-3.
- McNab, Chris (2009). Armies of the Napoleonic Wars: An Illustrated History. Oxford: Osprey Publishing. ISBN 978-1-84603-470-1.
- von Pivka, Otto (1979). Armies of the Napoleonic Era. New York: Taplinger.
- Ryan, Edward (1999). Napoleon's Elite Cavalry : Cavalry of the Imperial Guard, 1804-1815. London: Greenhill Books. ISBN 1-853-67-371-4.
- Smith, Digby (2008). An Illustrated Encyclopedia of Uniforms of the Napoleonic Wars. London: Lorenz books. ISBN 978-0-7548-1571-6.
