= Salon of 1808 =

1808 art exhibition in Paris

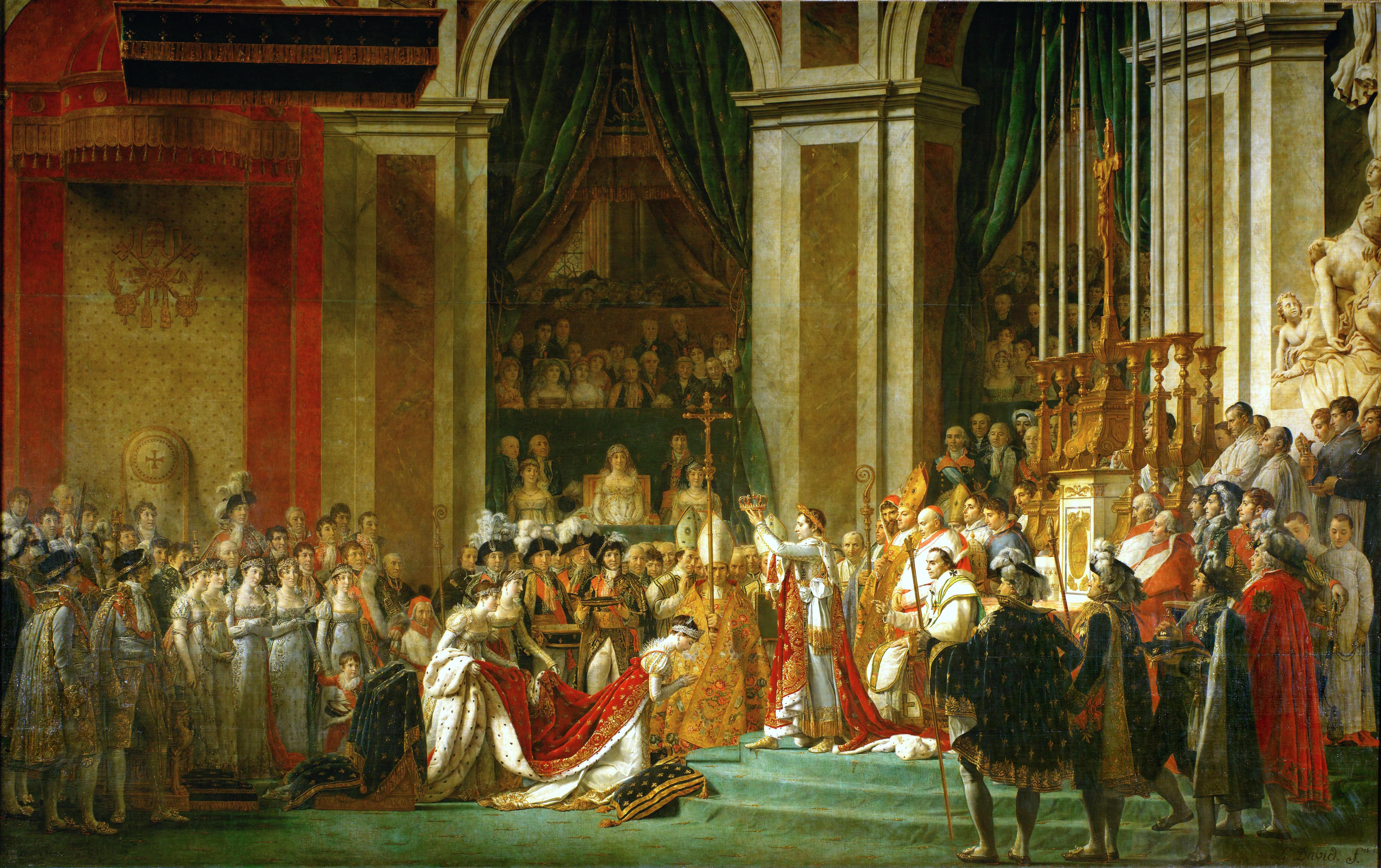
The Coronation of Napoleon by Jacques-Louis David

The Salon of 1808 was an art exhibition held at the Louvre in Paris which opened on 14 October 1808. It featured paintings, sculptures, prints and architectural designs from leading figures of the First French Empire.

== Background ==
The Salon had been held since the seventeenth century but during the Napoleonic era it became a showpiece for images celebrating the regime of Napoleon and the wider Bonaparte dynasty.

It was held the same year as Napoleon, at the height of his power, hosted the Congress of Erfurt a follow-up to his triumph at the Congress of Tilsit. However, the year also saw the Peninsular War develop into a serious conflict for France, with the May uprising in Spain and the intervention of British forces after Napoleon placed his brother Joseph on the Spanish throne.

== Exhibits ==
One of the highlights of the exhibition was The Coronation of Napoleon by Jacques-Louis David. Depicting the 1804 Coronation of the Emperor and Empress, it was finished the previous year. David also exhibited The Intervention of the Sabine Women and Napoleon in Imperial Costume.

A number of paintings portrayed scenes from French military campaigns of the last decade. Notable amongst them was Napoleon on the Battlefield of Eylau by Antoine-Jean Gros depicting the recent War of the Fourth Coalition. Other showed events from the victorious Austerlitz Campaign against Austria in 1805.

Amongst the various genre paintings exhibited by Louis-Léopold Boilly two directly references the ongoing war Departure of the Conscripts and The Reading of the Bulletin of the Grande Armée.

== Gallery ==
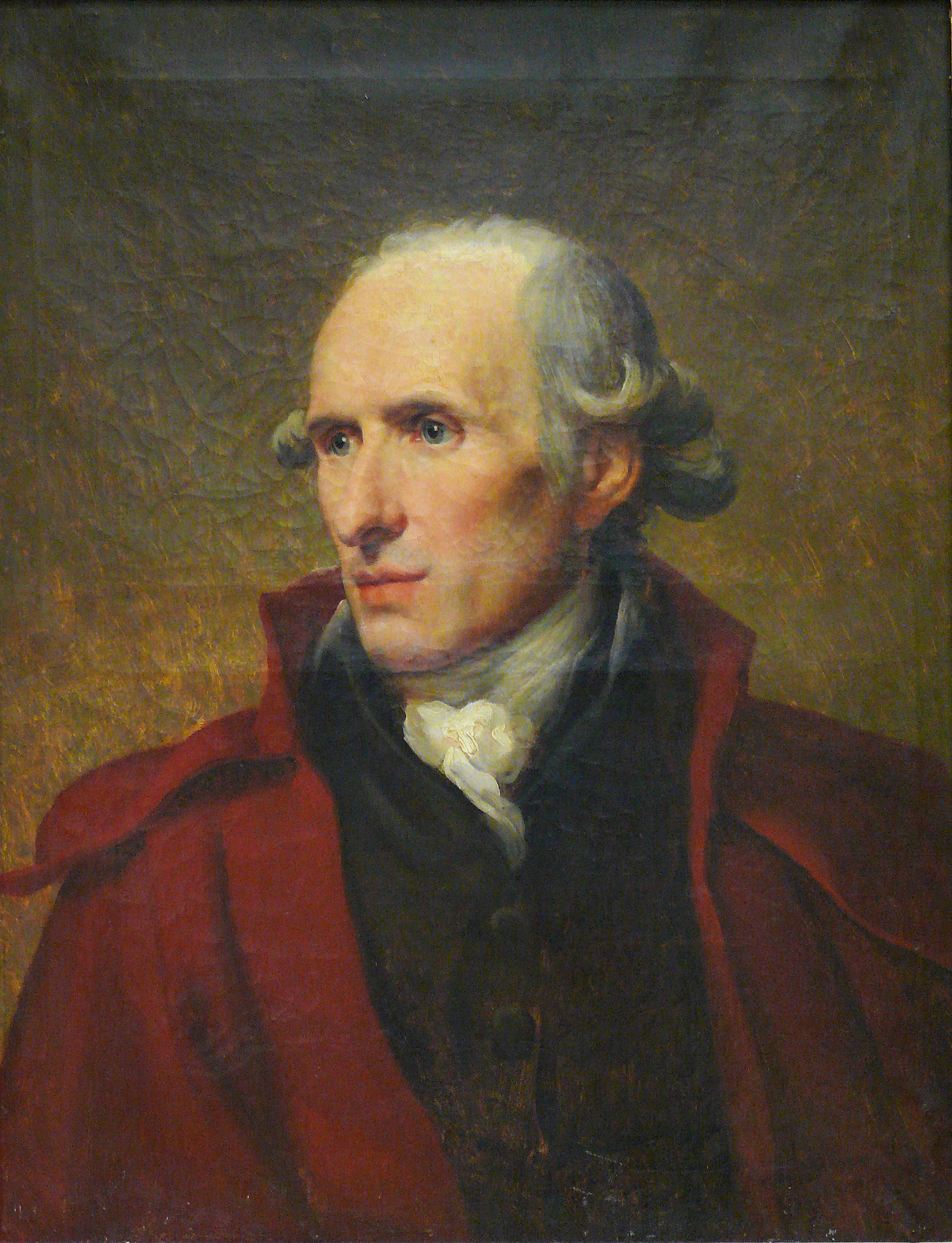
Portrait of Antonio Canova by François Gérard

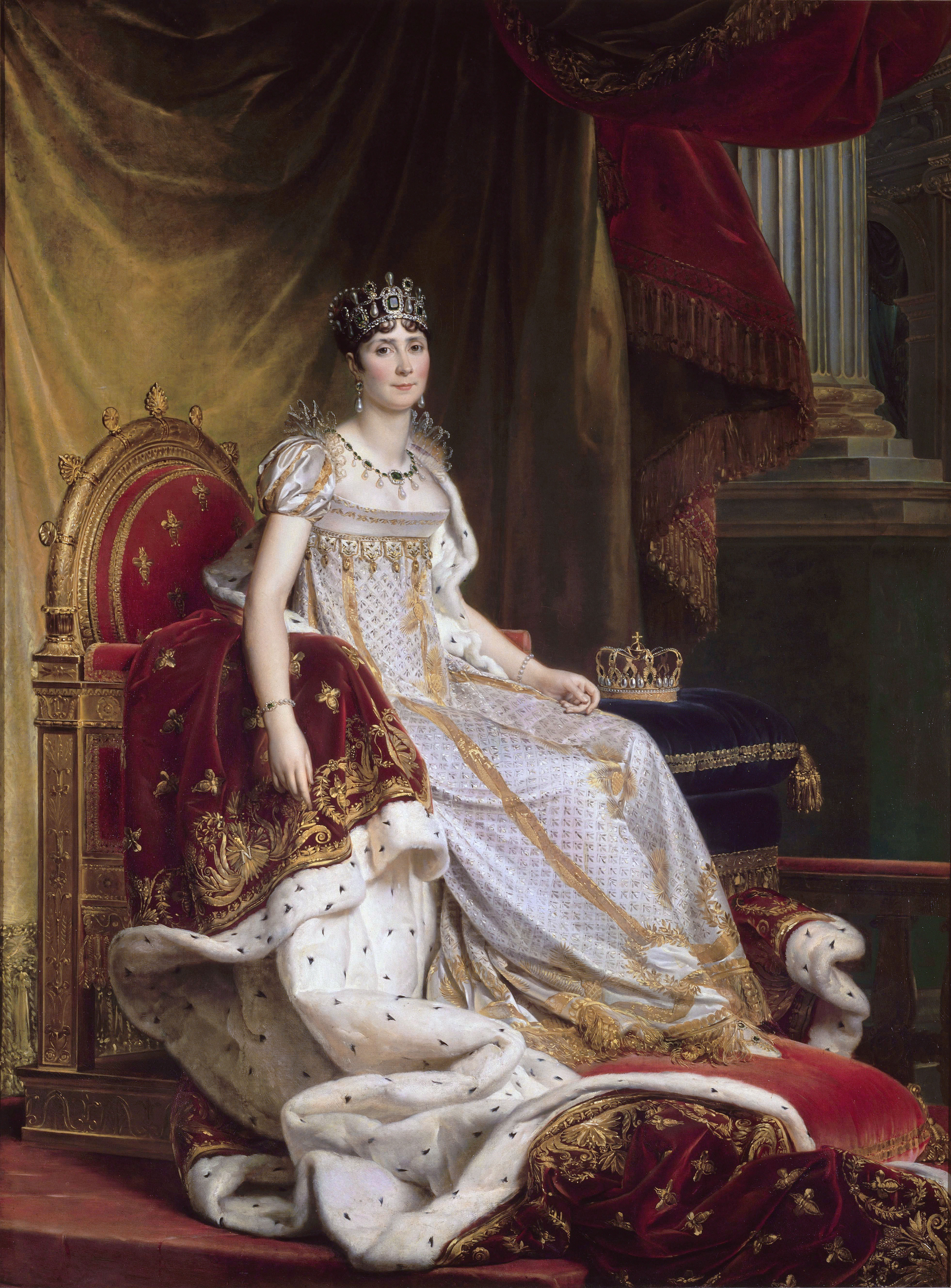
Portrait of the Empress Josephine in Coronation Robes by François Gérard

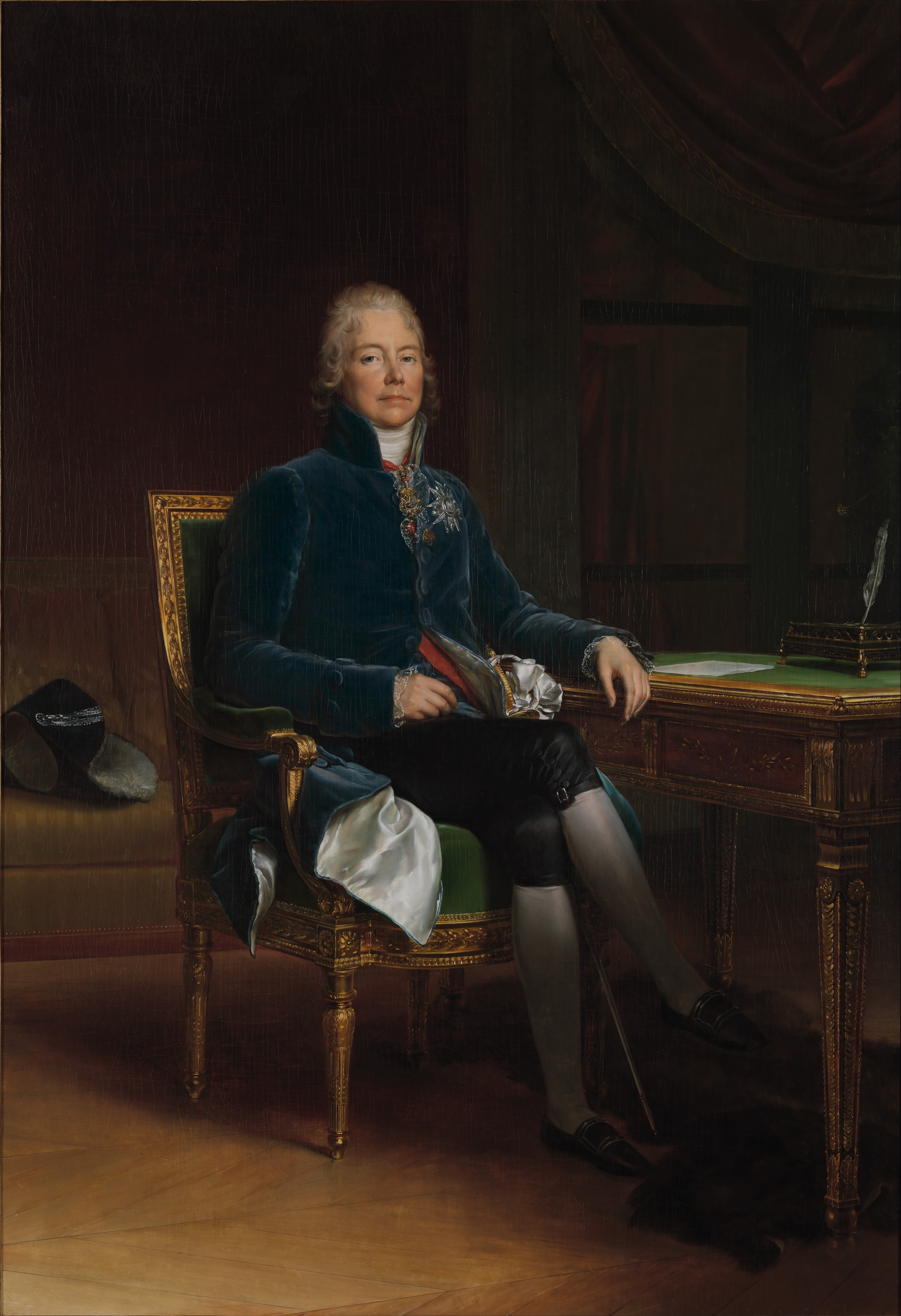
Portrait of Talleyrand by François Gérard

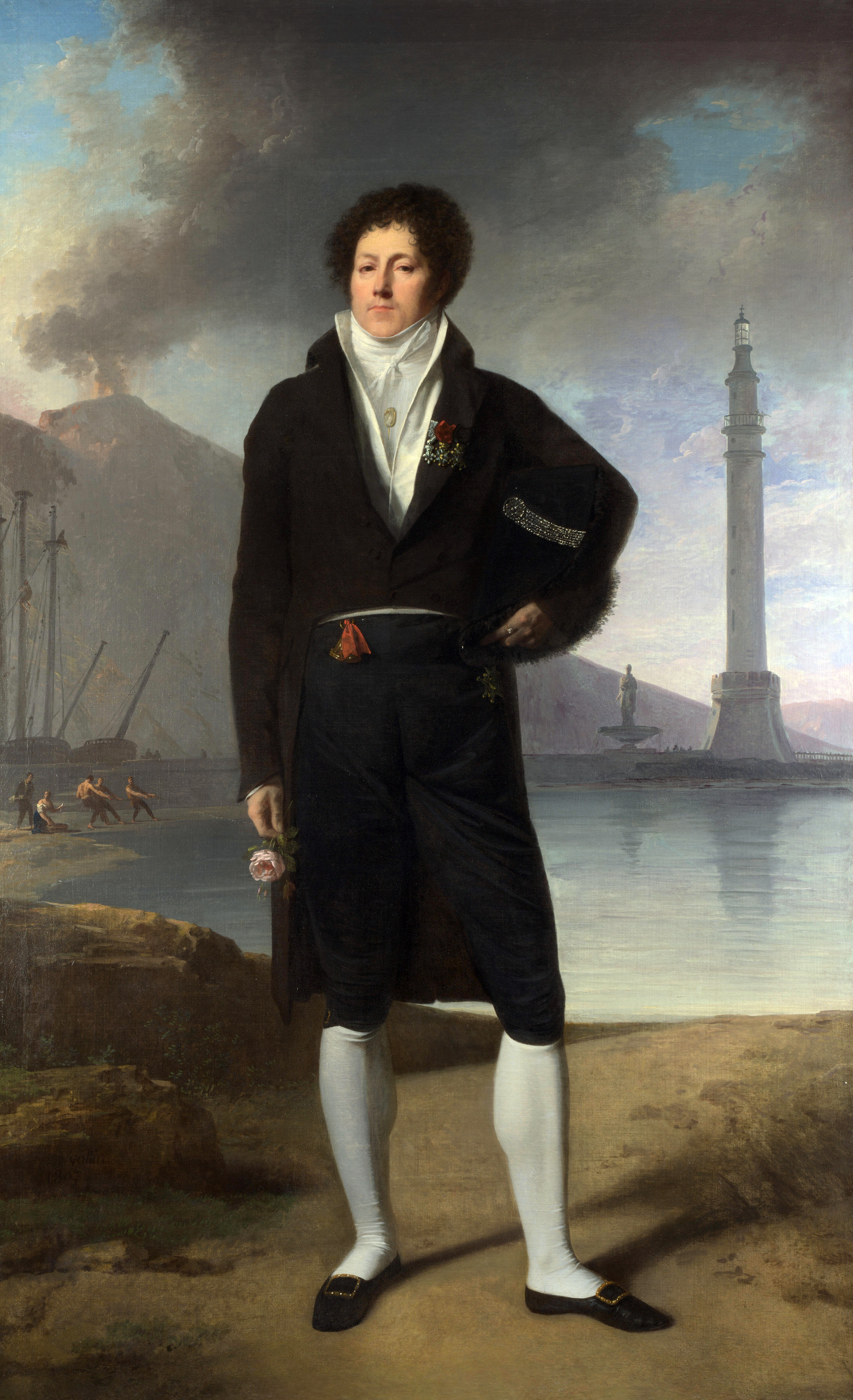
Portrait of Joseph Forlenze by Jacques-Antoine Vallin

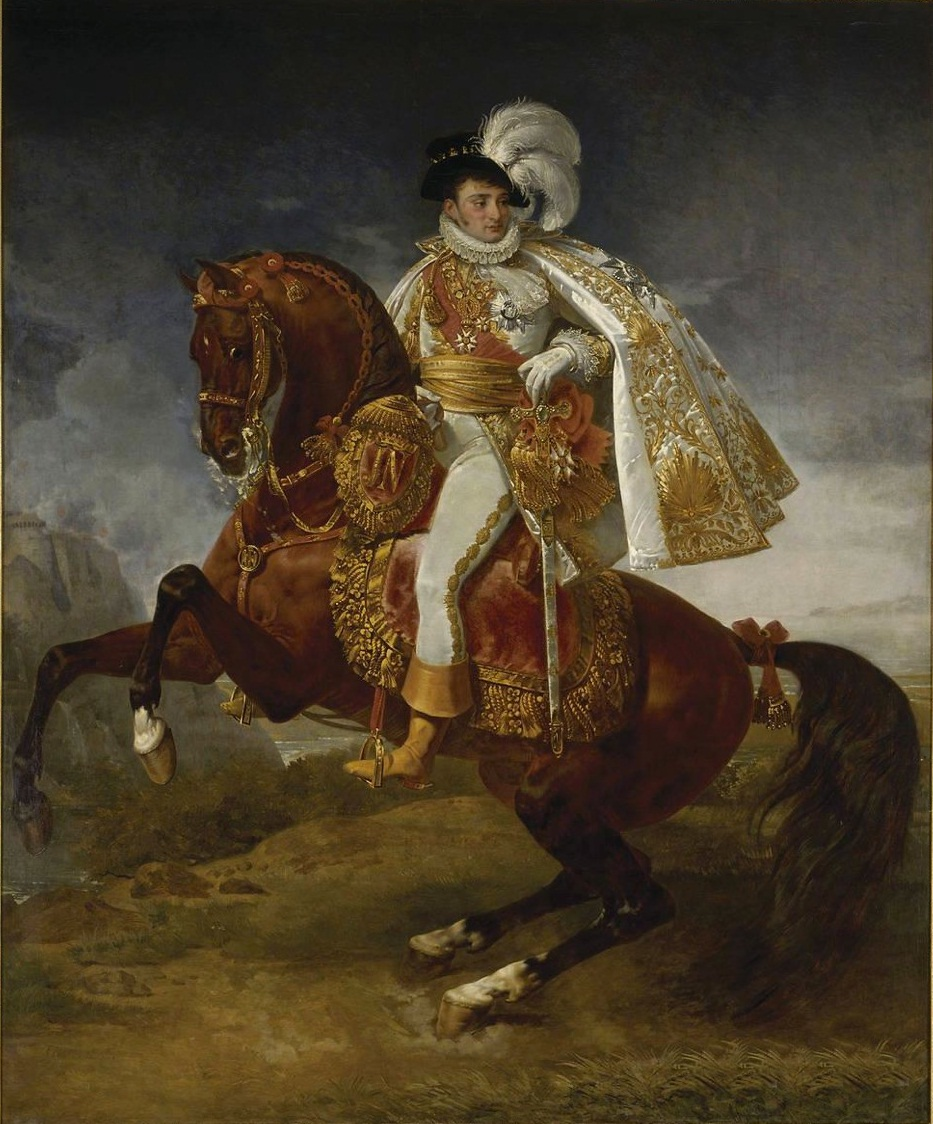
Equestrian Portrait of Jerome Bonaparte by Antoine-Jean Gros

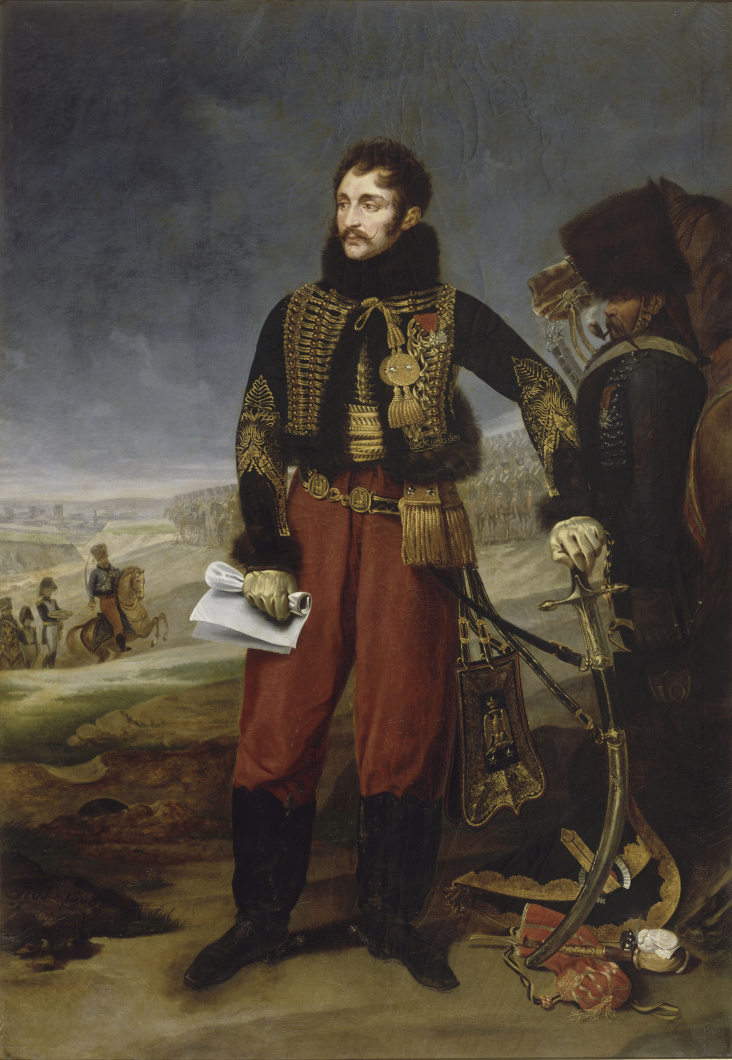
General Lasalle at the Siege of Stettin by Antoine-Jean Gros

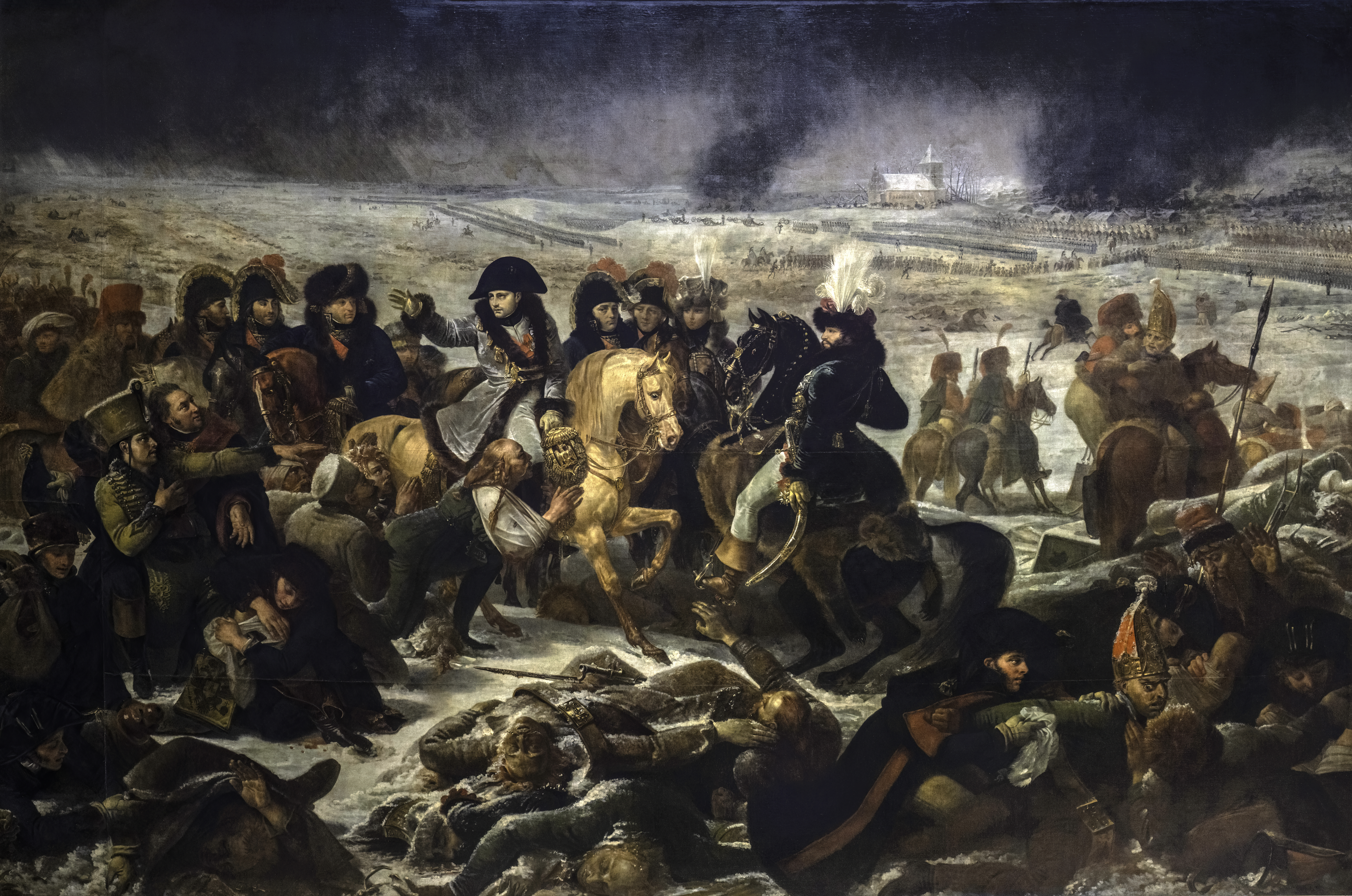
Napoleon on the Battlefield of Eylau by Antoine-Jean Gros

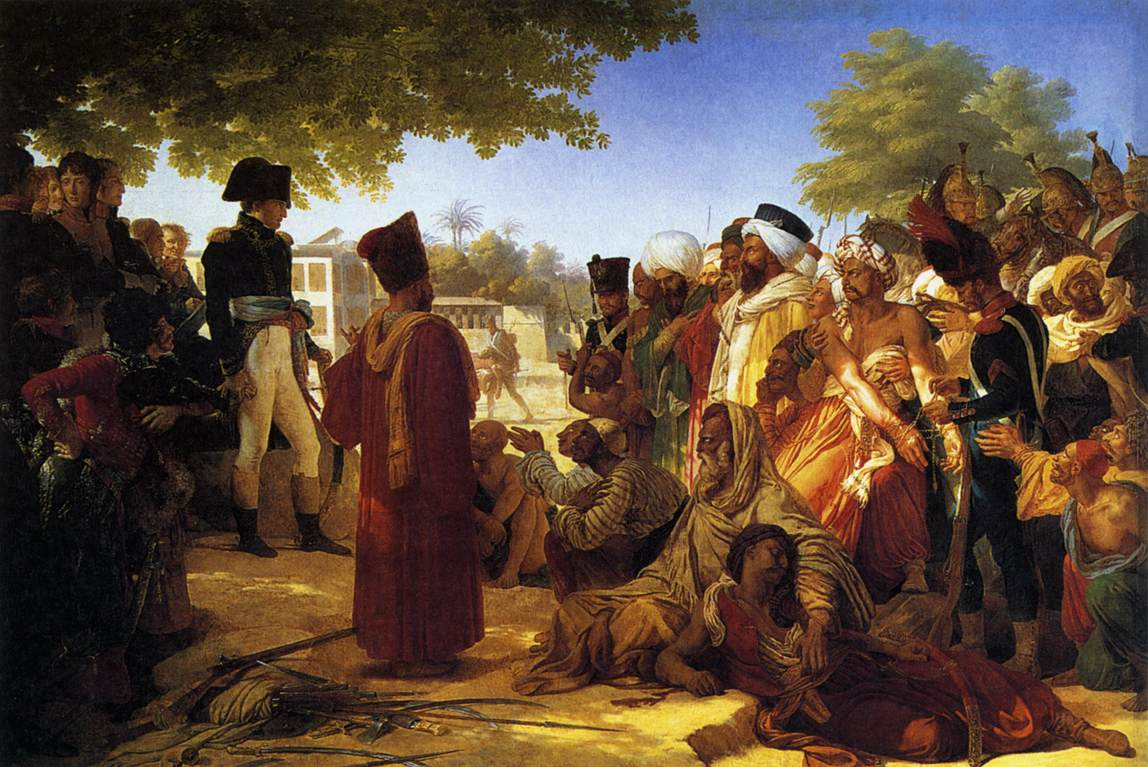
Napoleon Pardoning the Rebels at Cairo by Pierre-Narcisse Guérin

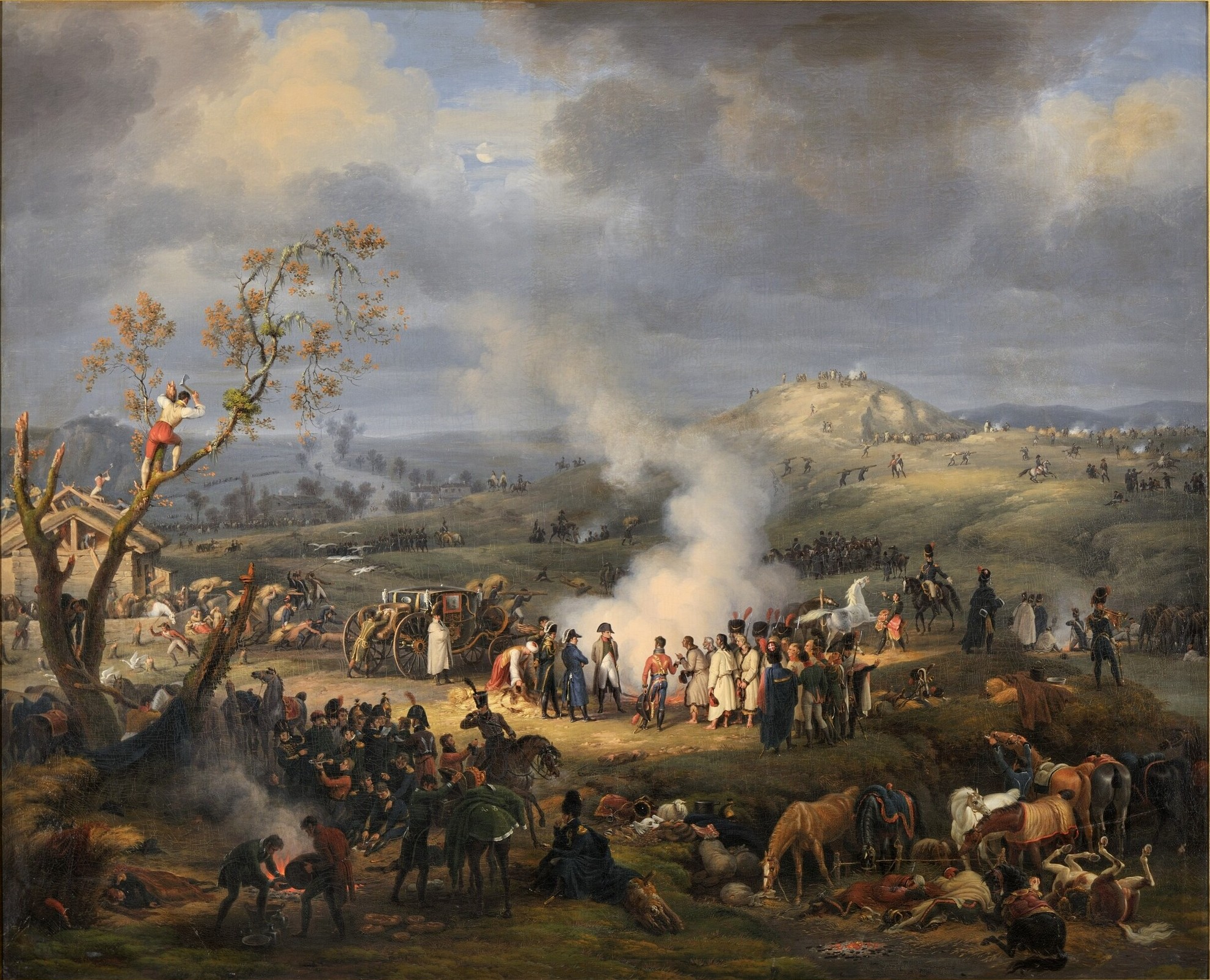
The Battle of Austerlitz by Louis-François Lejeune

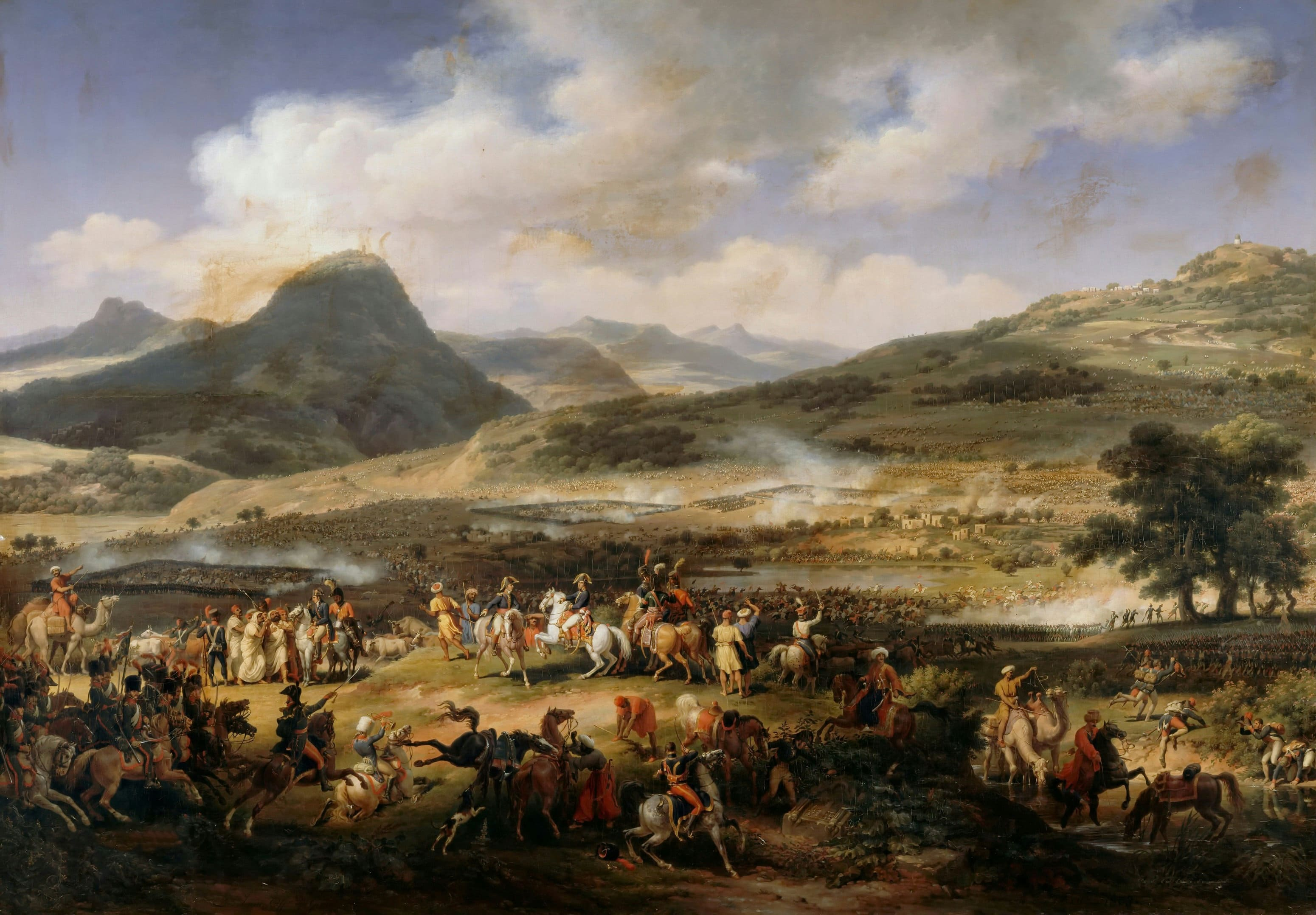
The Battle of Mount Tabor by Louis-François Lejeune

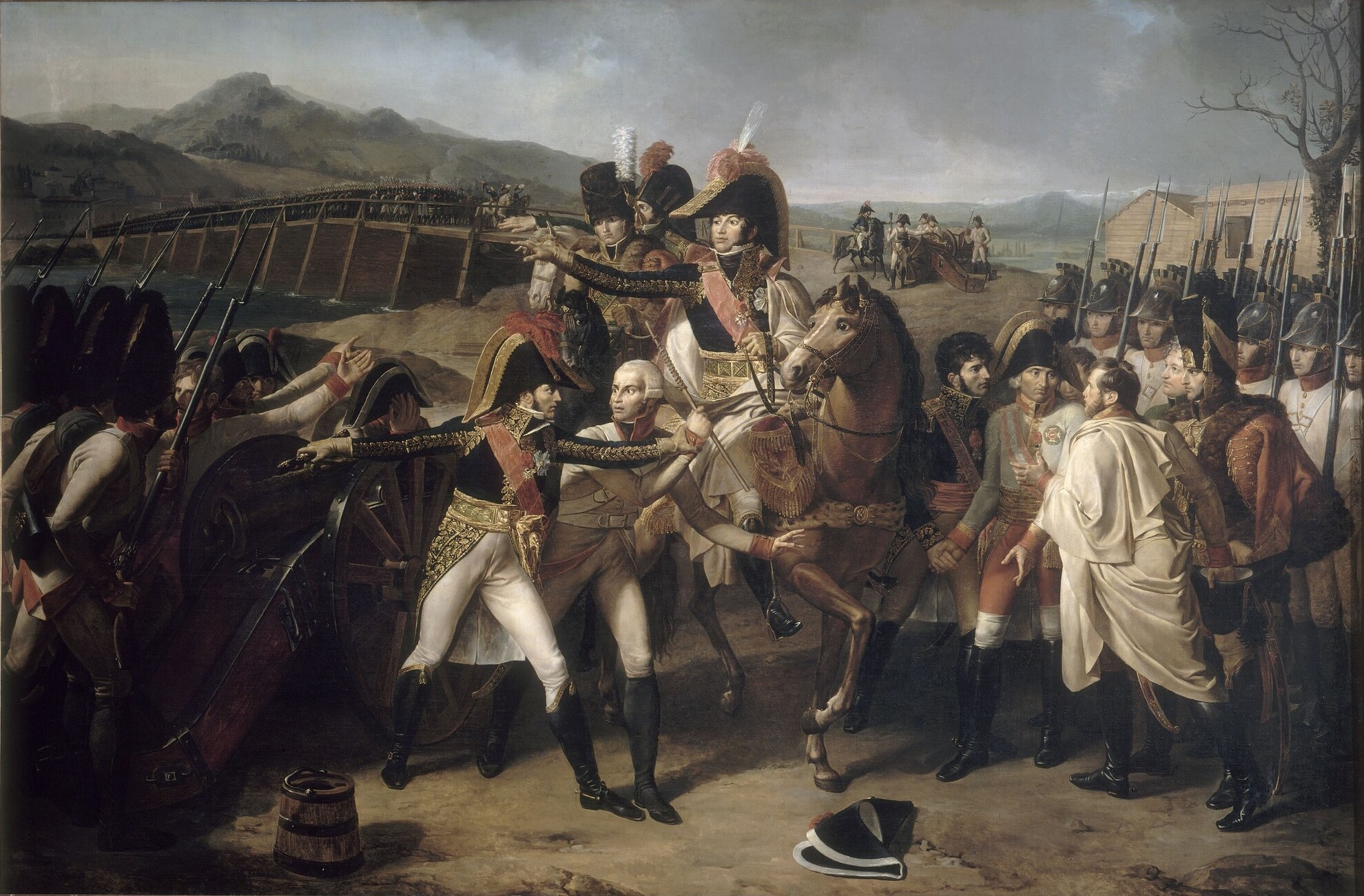
Surprise du Pont du Danube by Guillaume Guillon-Lethière

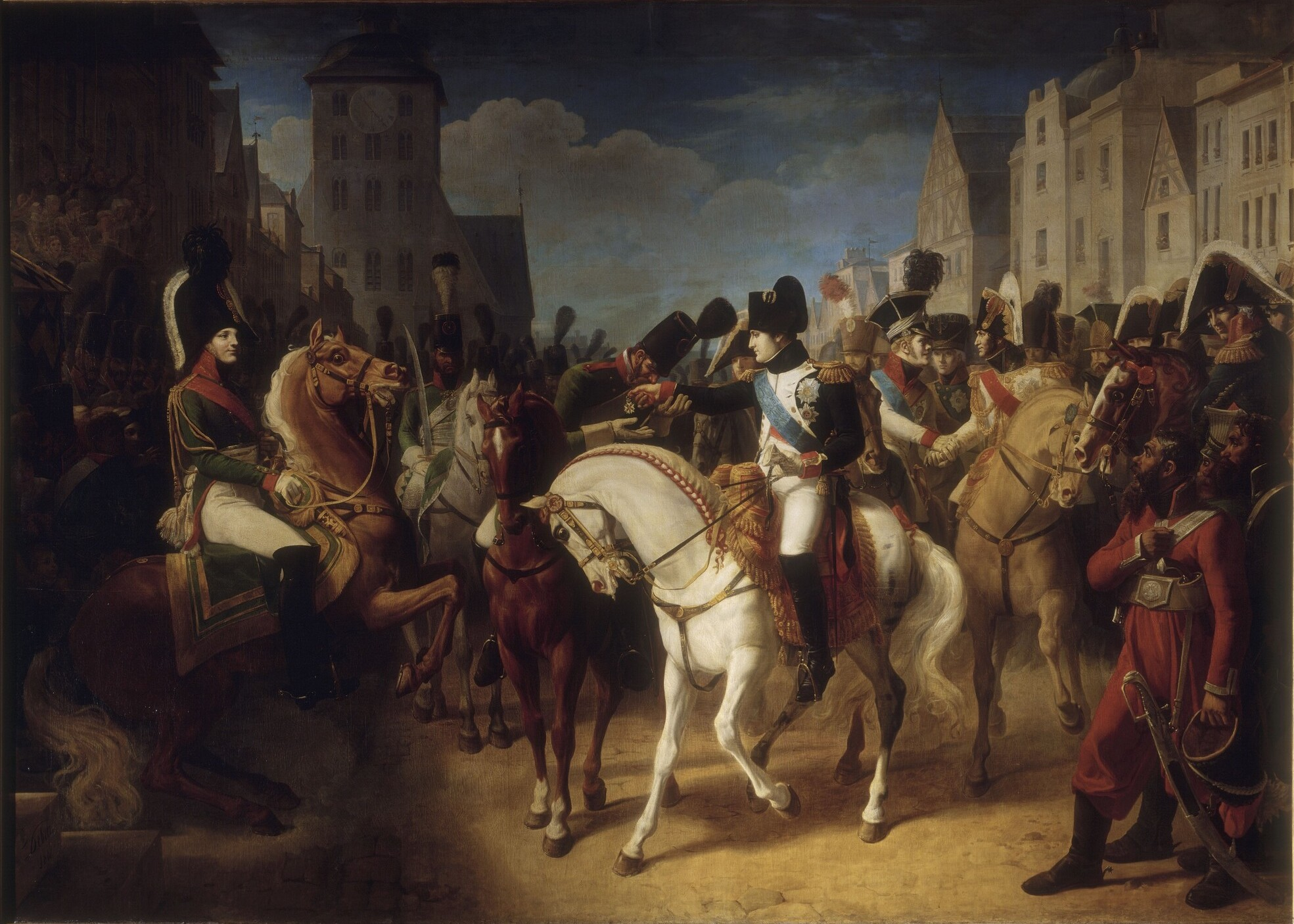
Napoleon Awards a Russian Soldier the Legion of Honour at Tilsit by Jean-Baptiste Debret

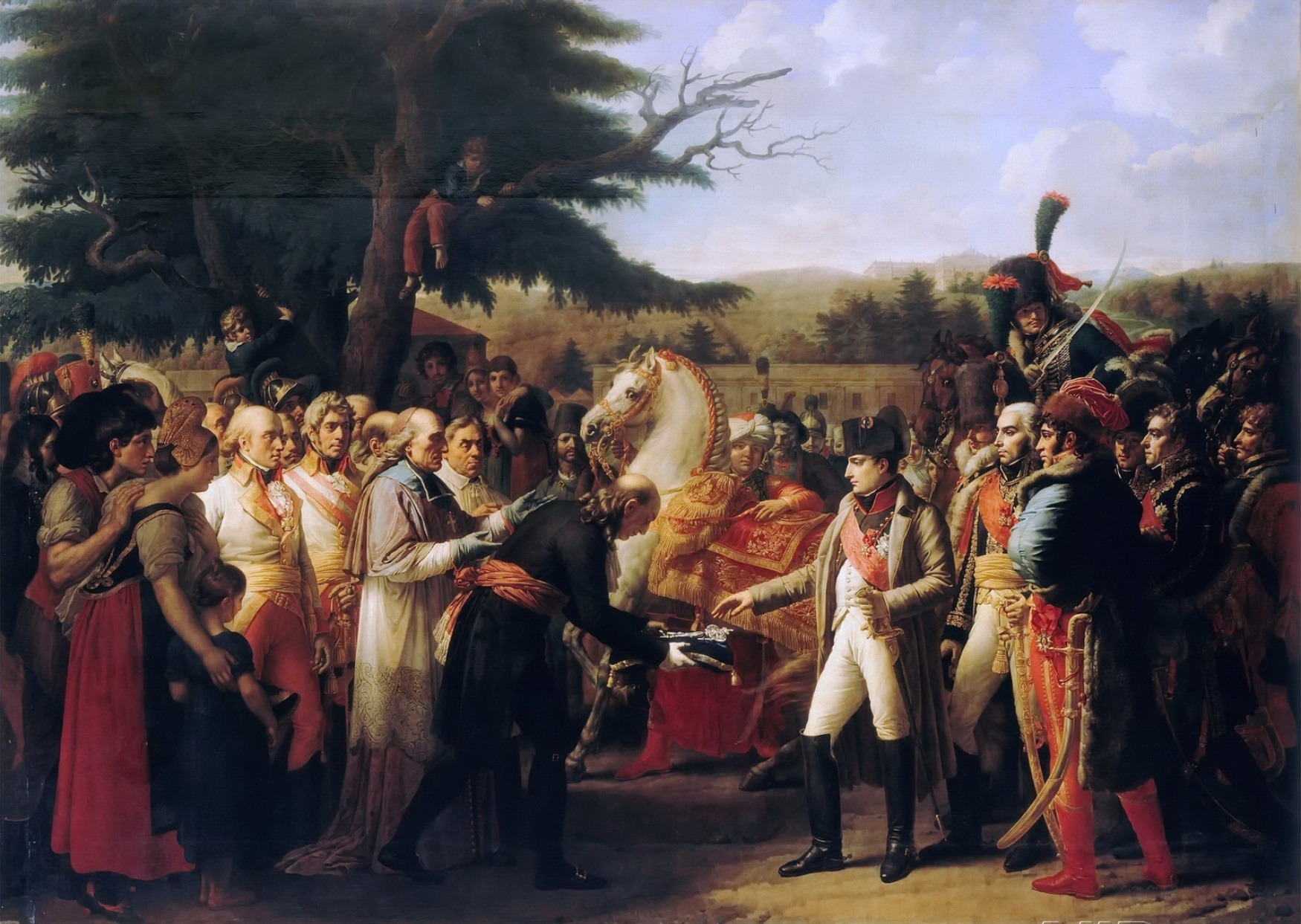
Napoleon Receiving the Keys of Vienna by Girodet

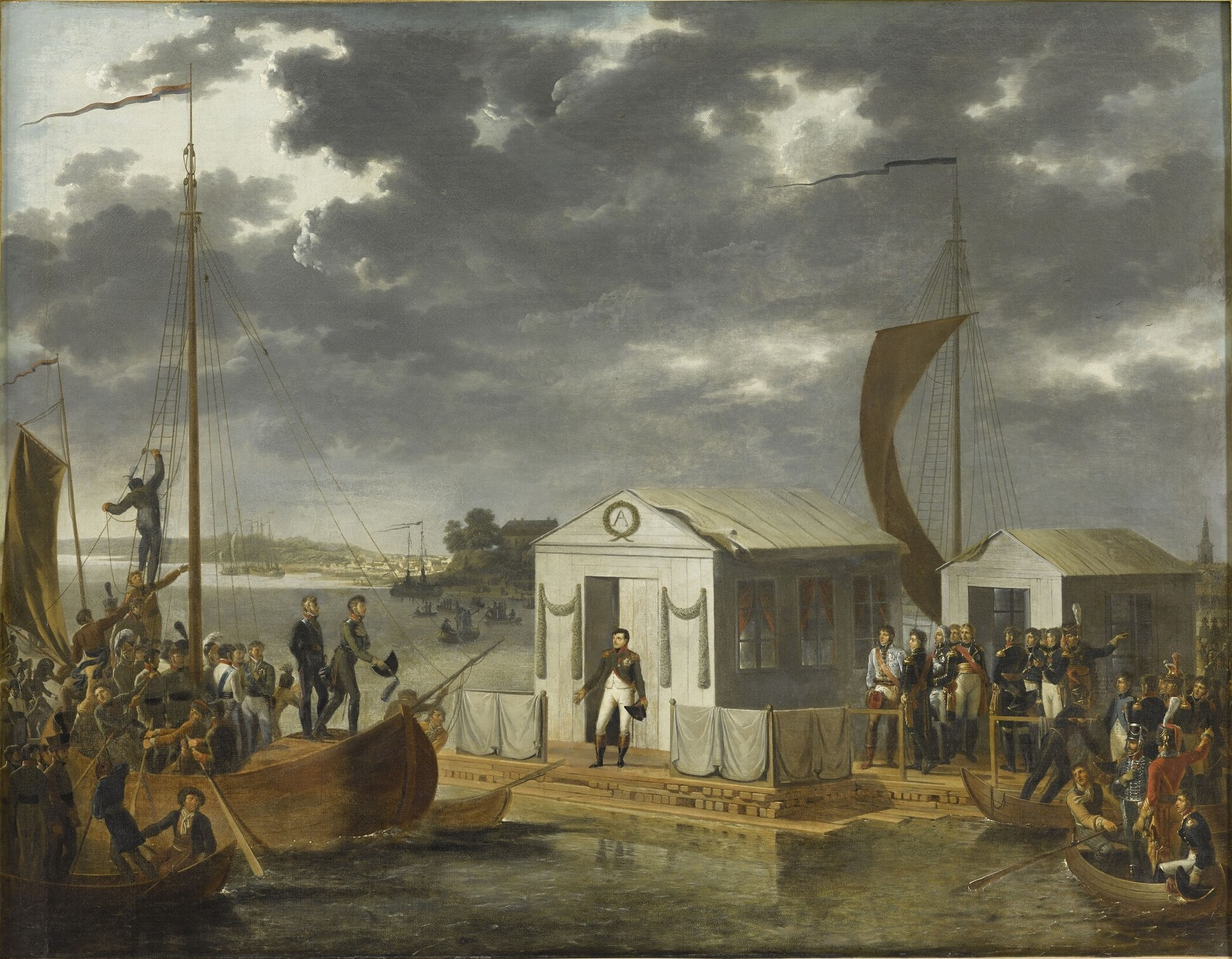
The Meeting of Napoleon I and Tsar Alexander I at Tilsit by Adolphe Roehn

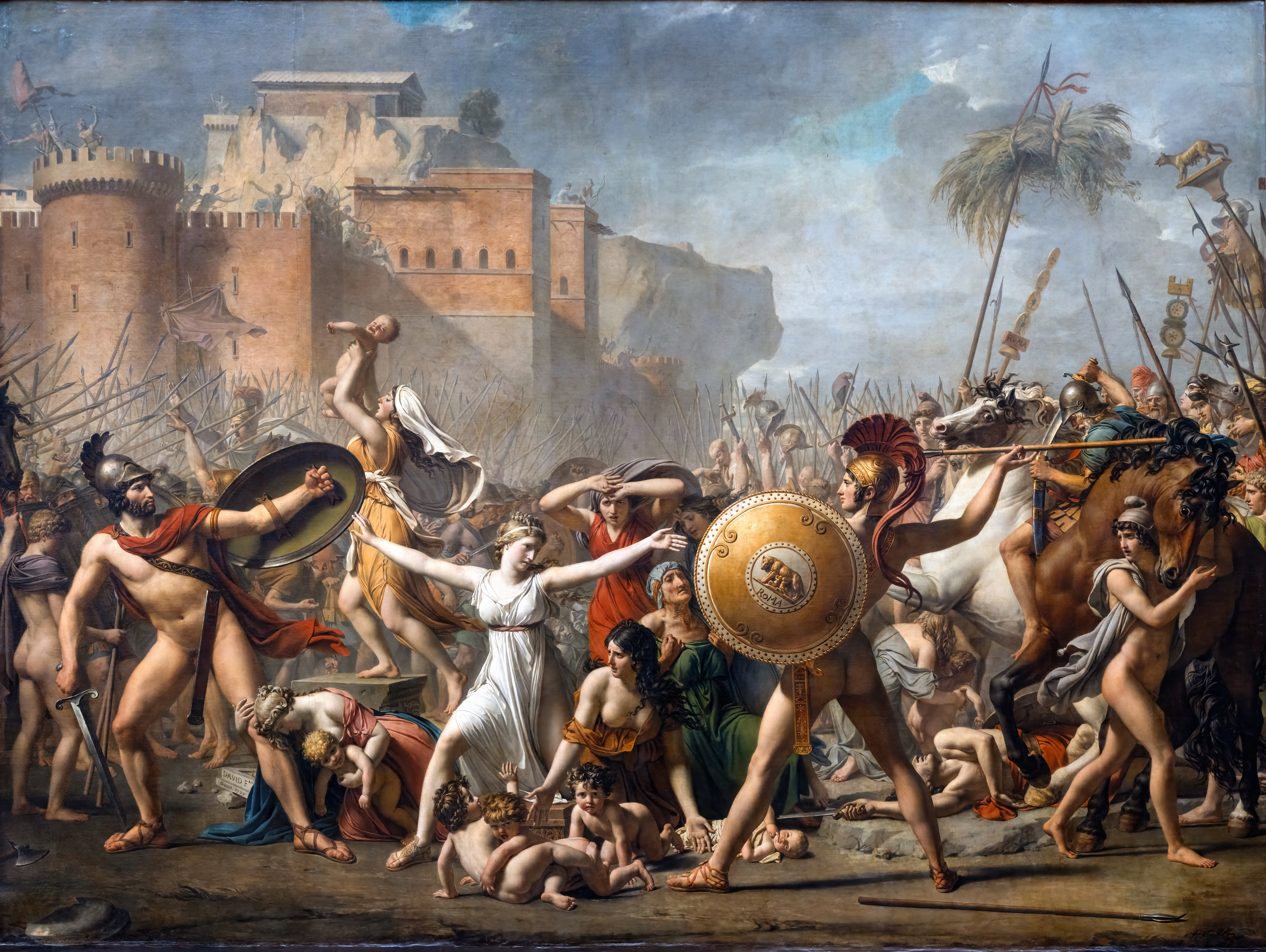
The Intervention of the Sabine Women by Jacques-Louis David

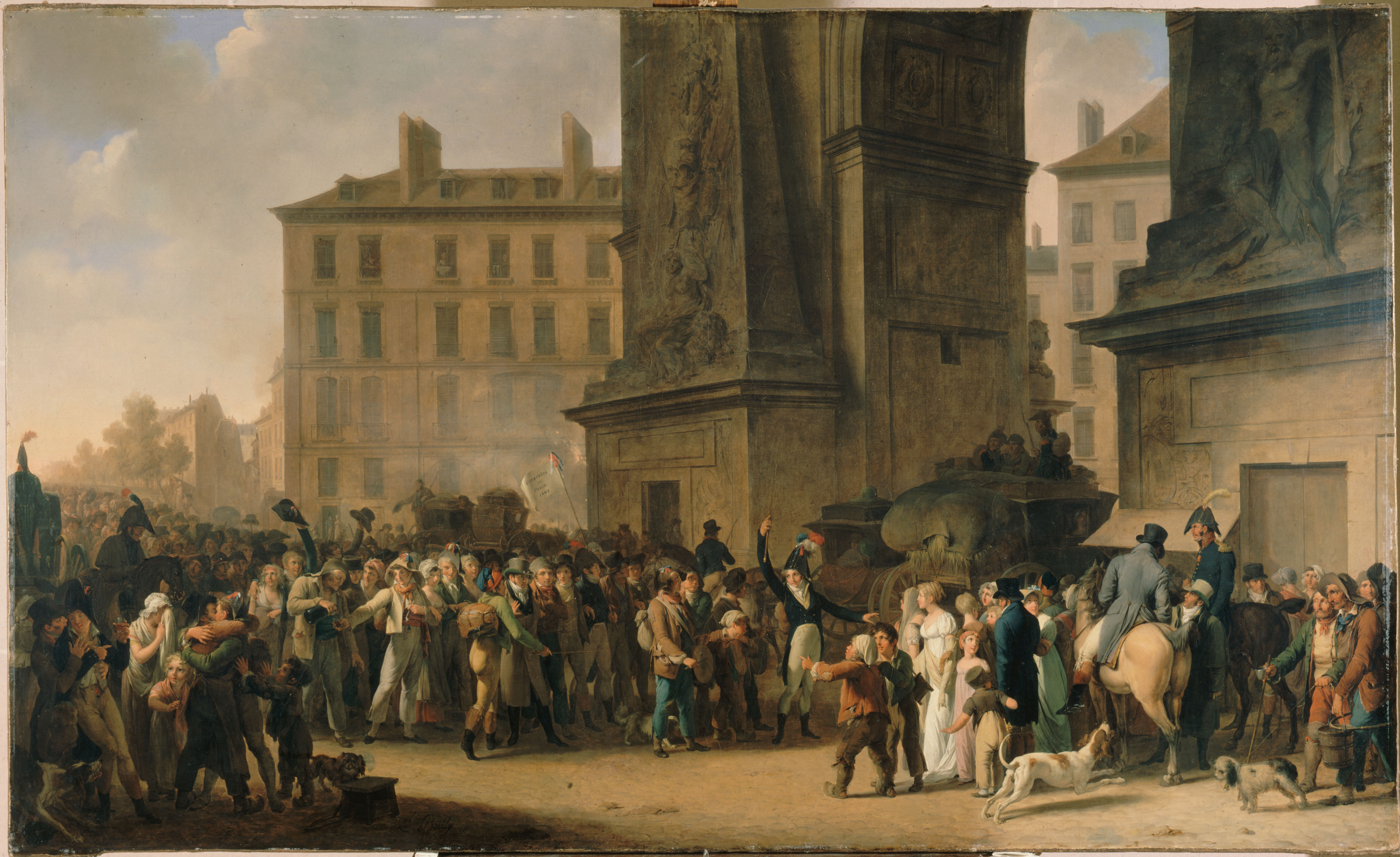
Departure of the Conscripts by Louis-Léopold Boilly

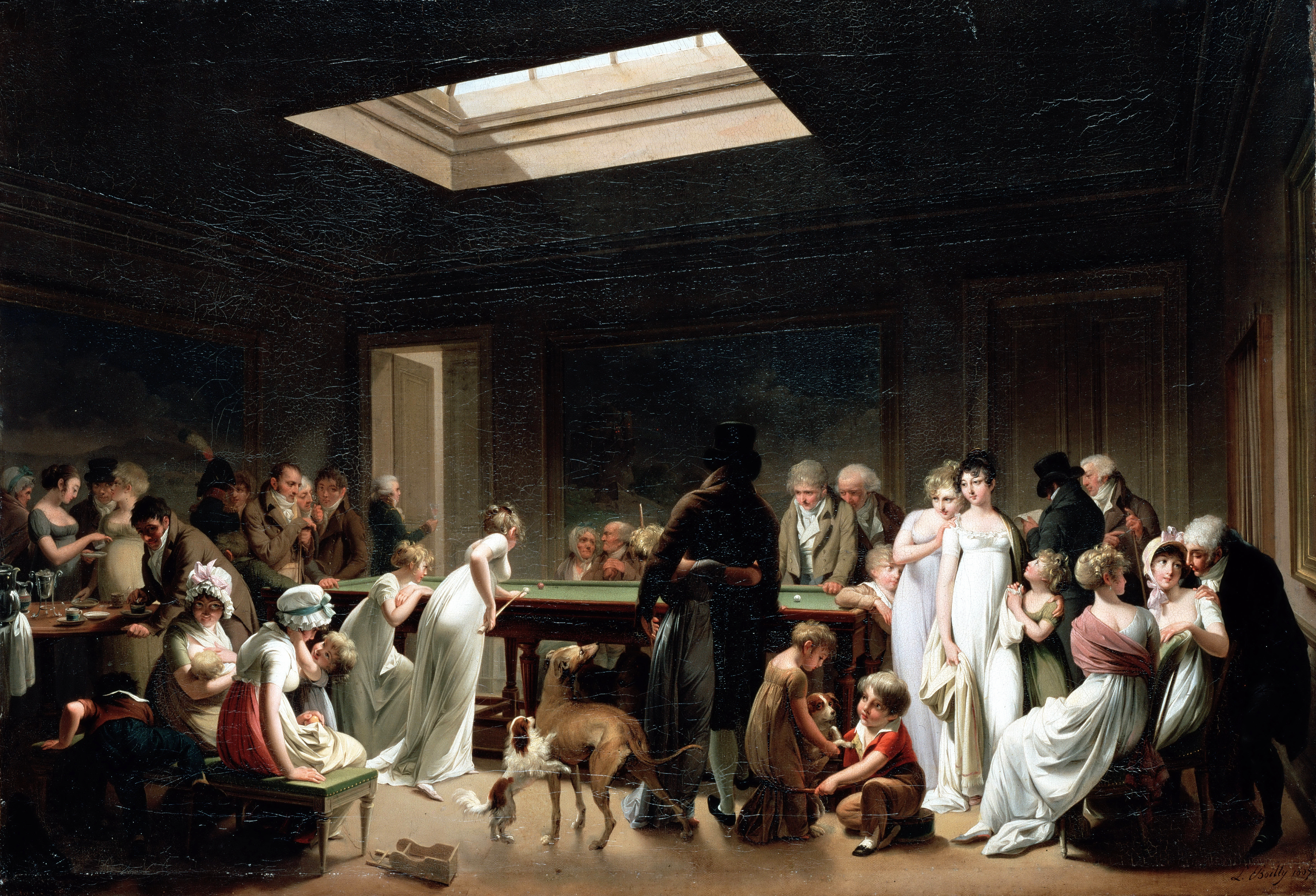
A Game of Billiards by Louis-Léopold Boilly

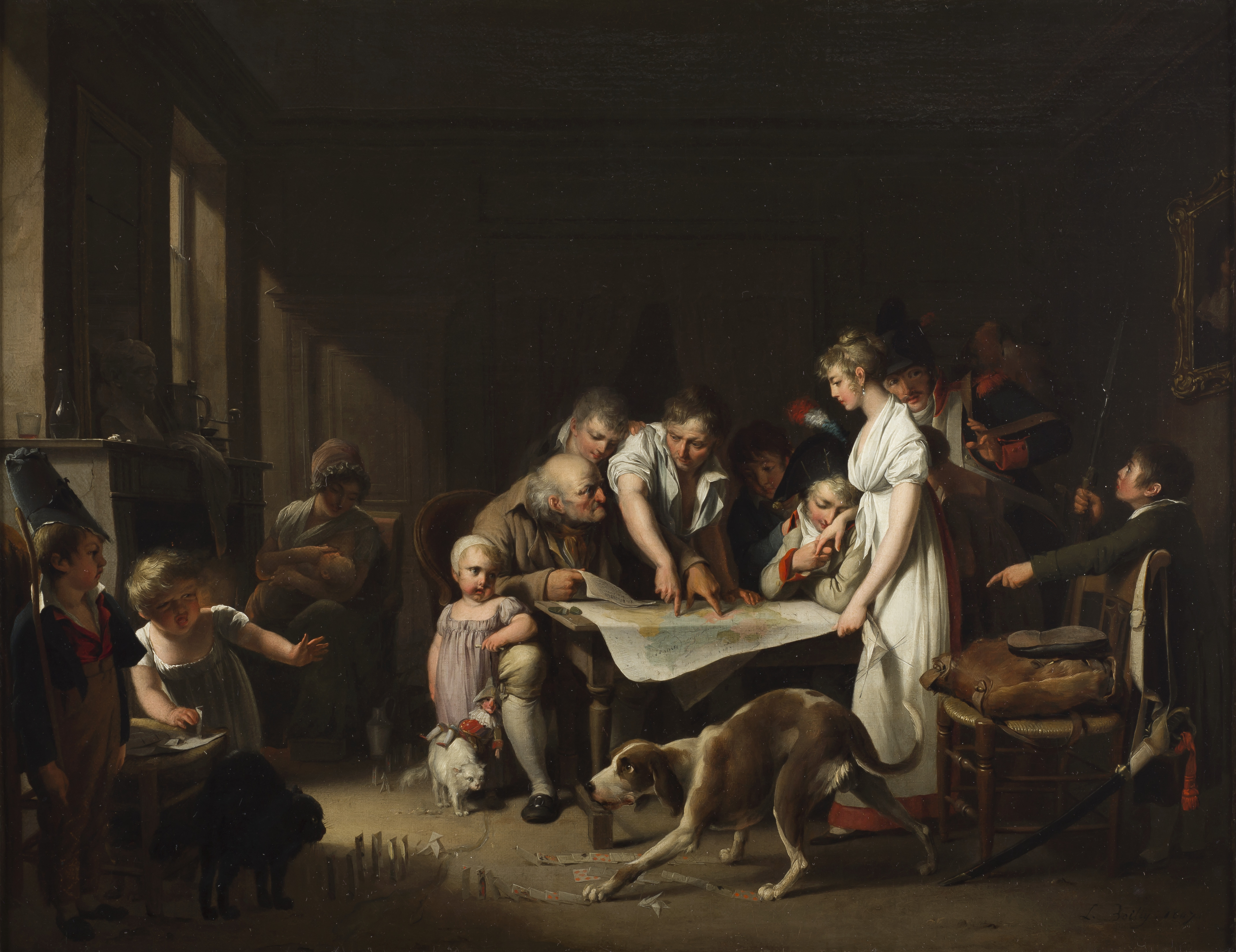
The Reading of the Bulletin of the Grande Armée by Louis-Léopold Boilly

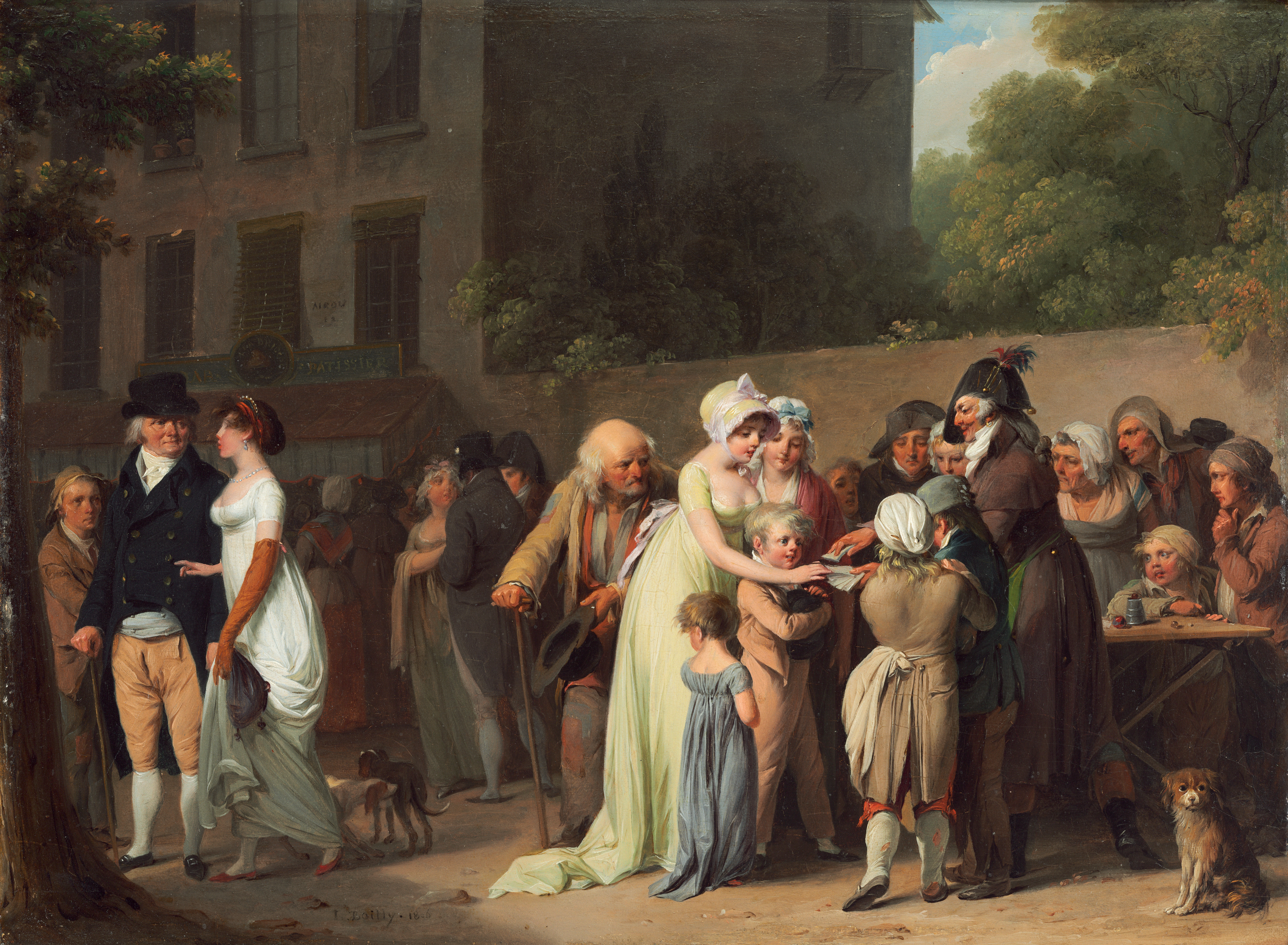
The Card Sharp on the Boulevard by Louis-Léopold Boilly

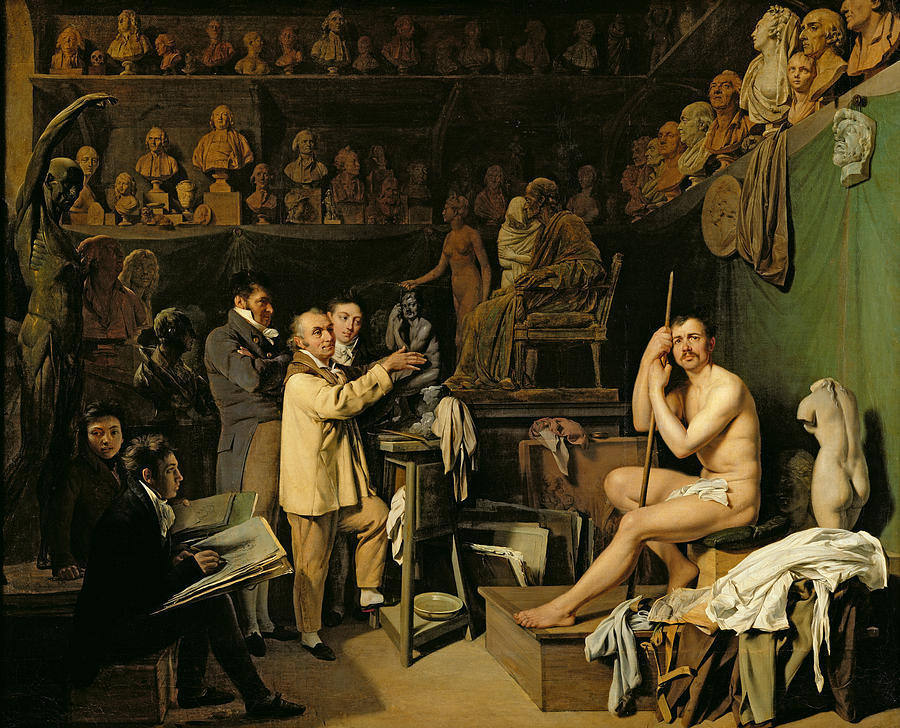
The Academy by Louis-Léopold Boilly

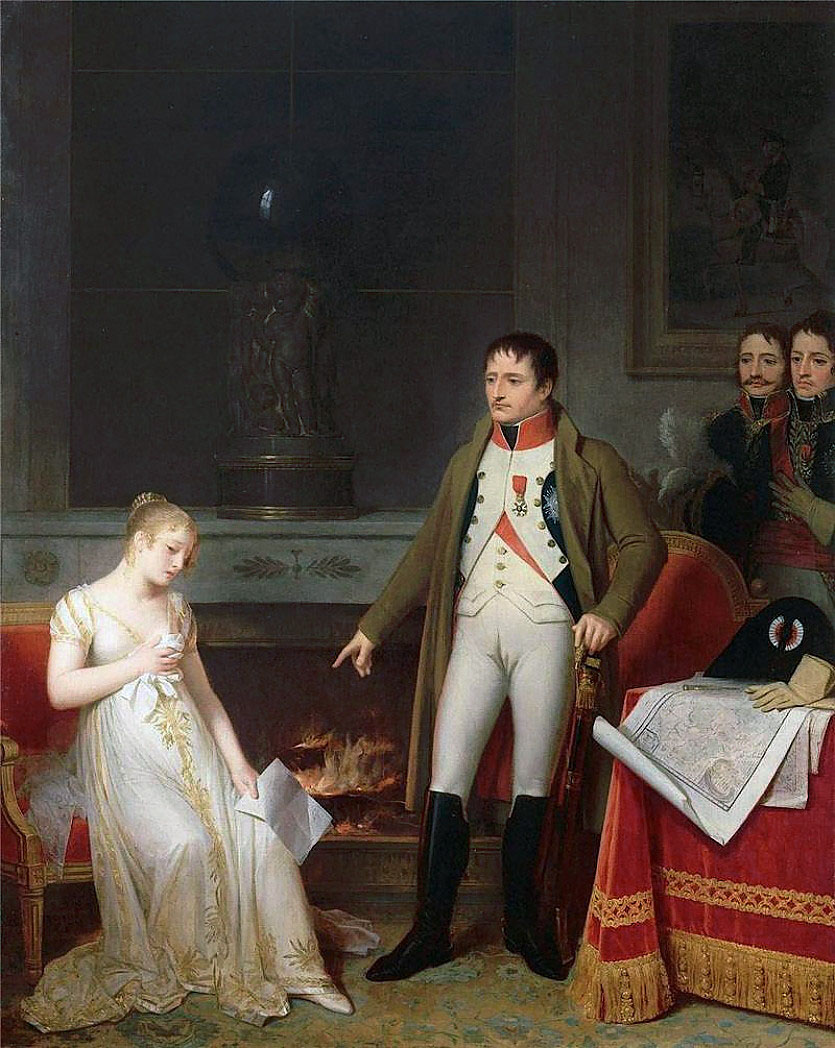
The Clemency of Napoleon by Marguerite Gérard

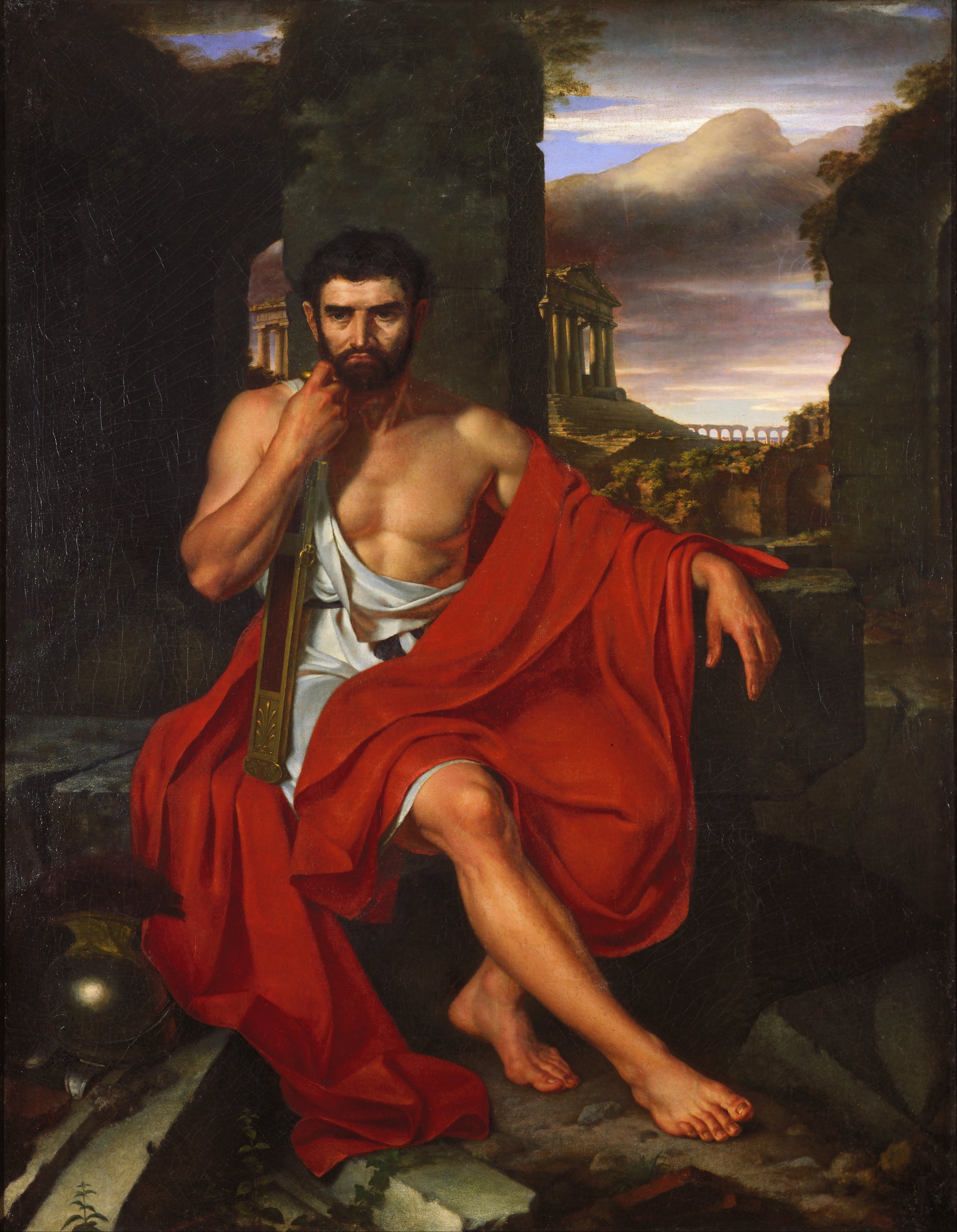
Caius Marius Amid the Ruins of Carthage by John Vanderlyn

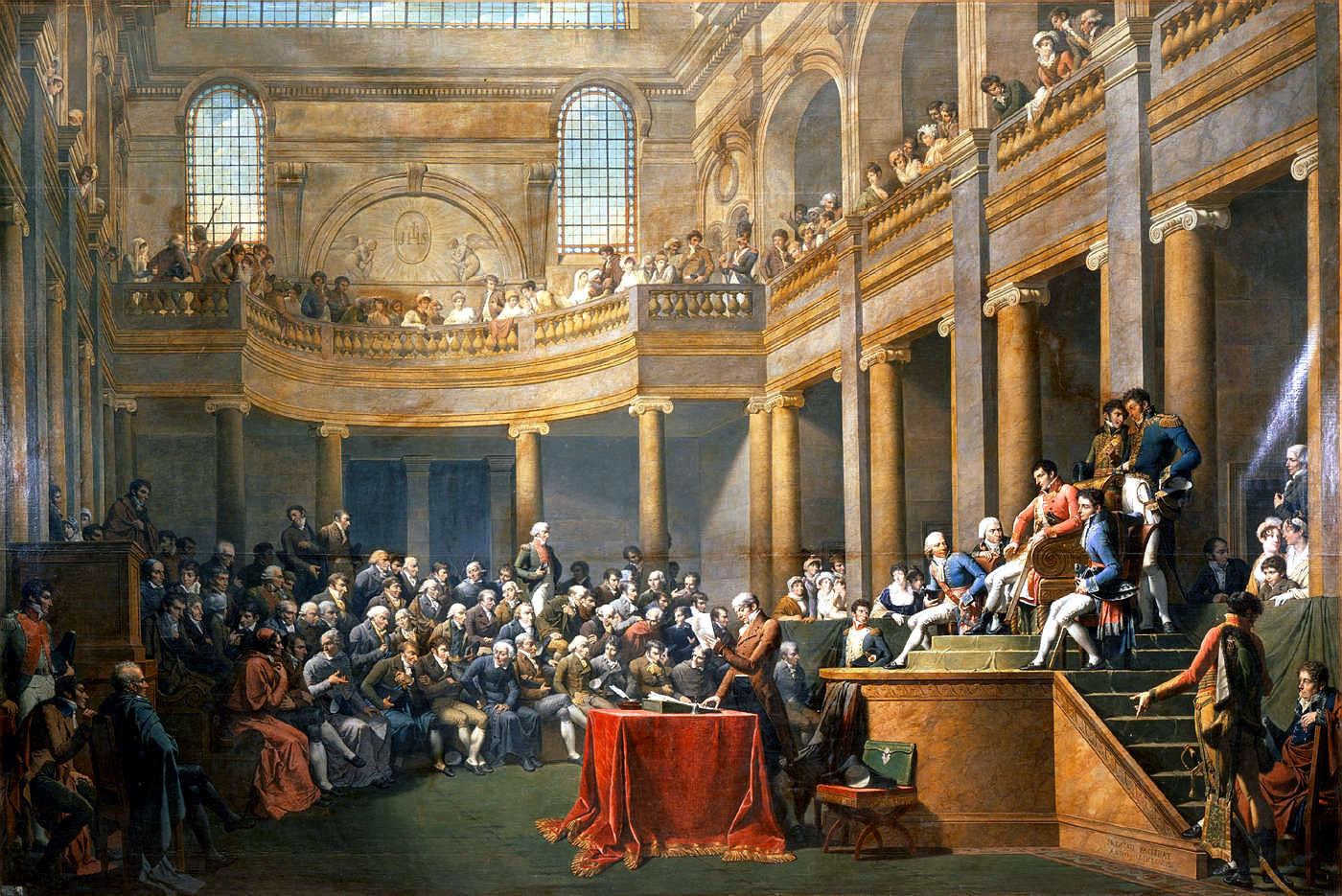
The Consulta of the Cisalpine Republic in Lyon by Nicolas-André Monsiau

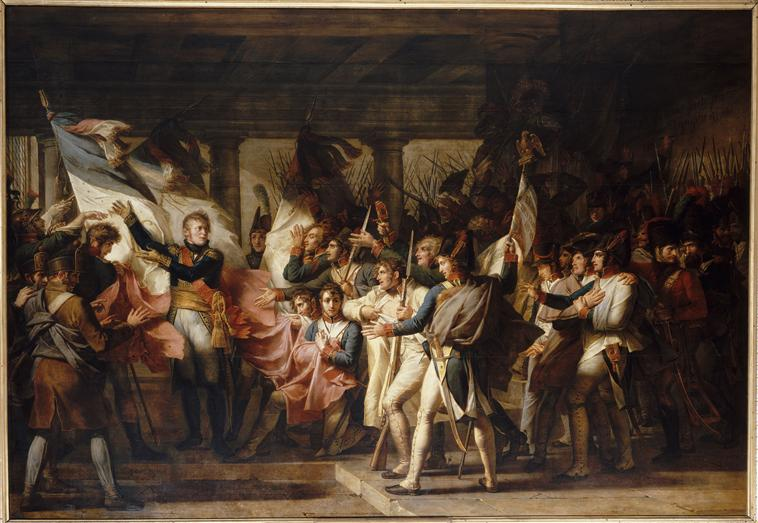
Marshal Ney Presents the Soldiers of the 76th Line with their Colours by Charles Meynier

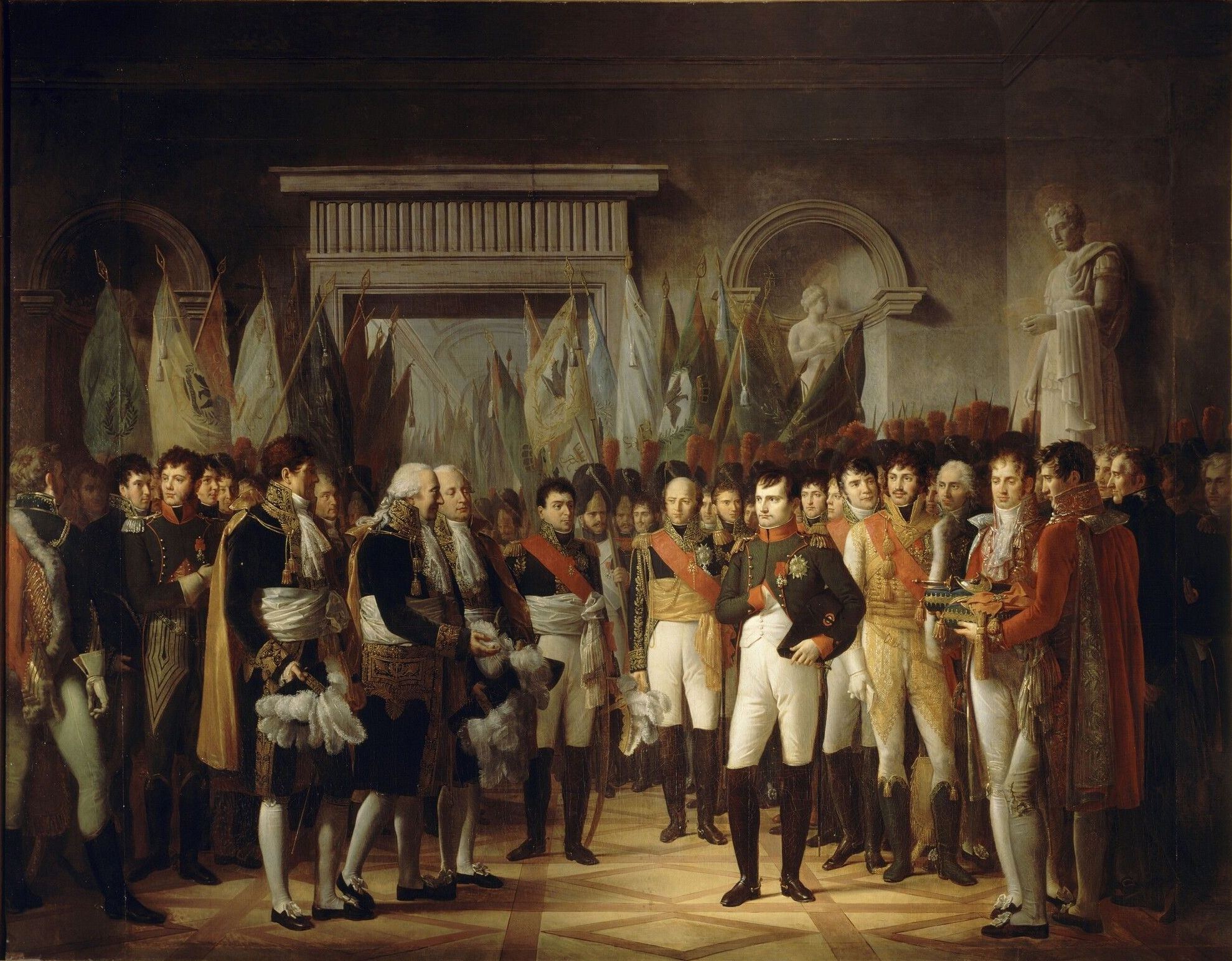
Napoleon Receiving the Senate Deputies in Berlin by René Théodore Berthon

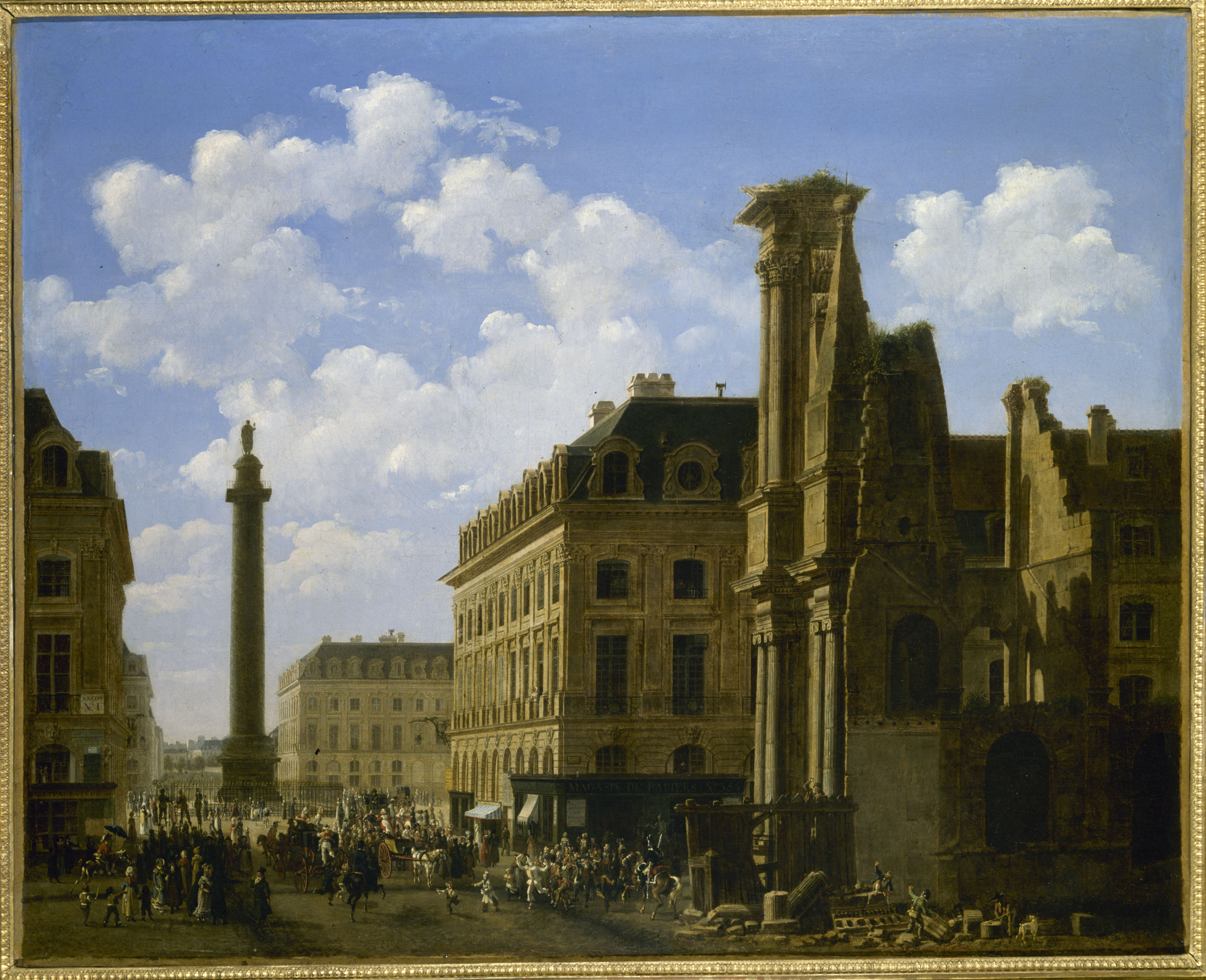
La place Vendôme et la rue de Castiglione by Étienne Bouhot

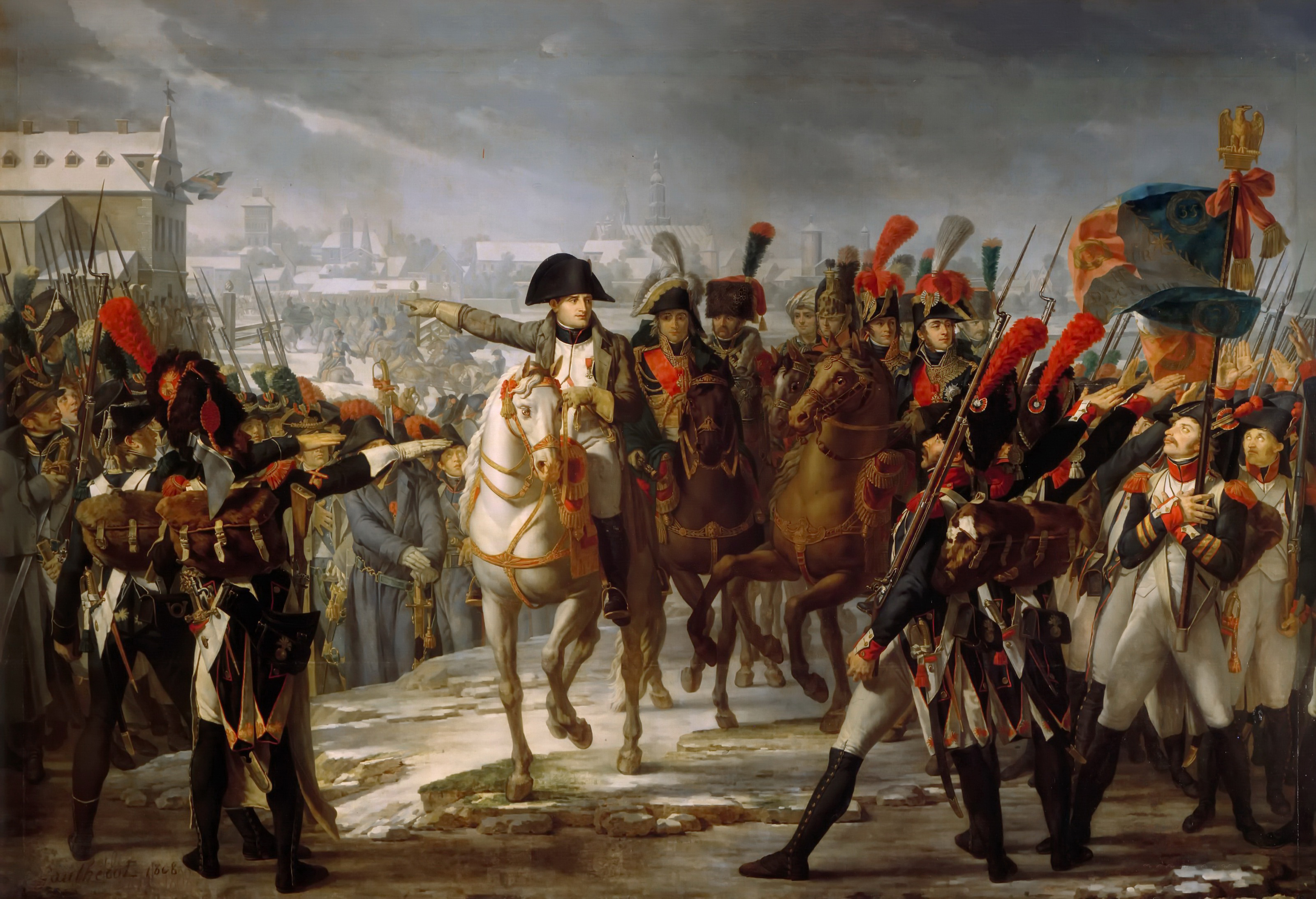
Napoleon at the Bridge Over the Lech at Augsburg by Claude Gautherot

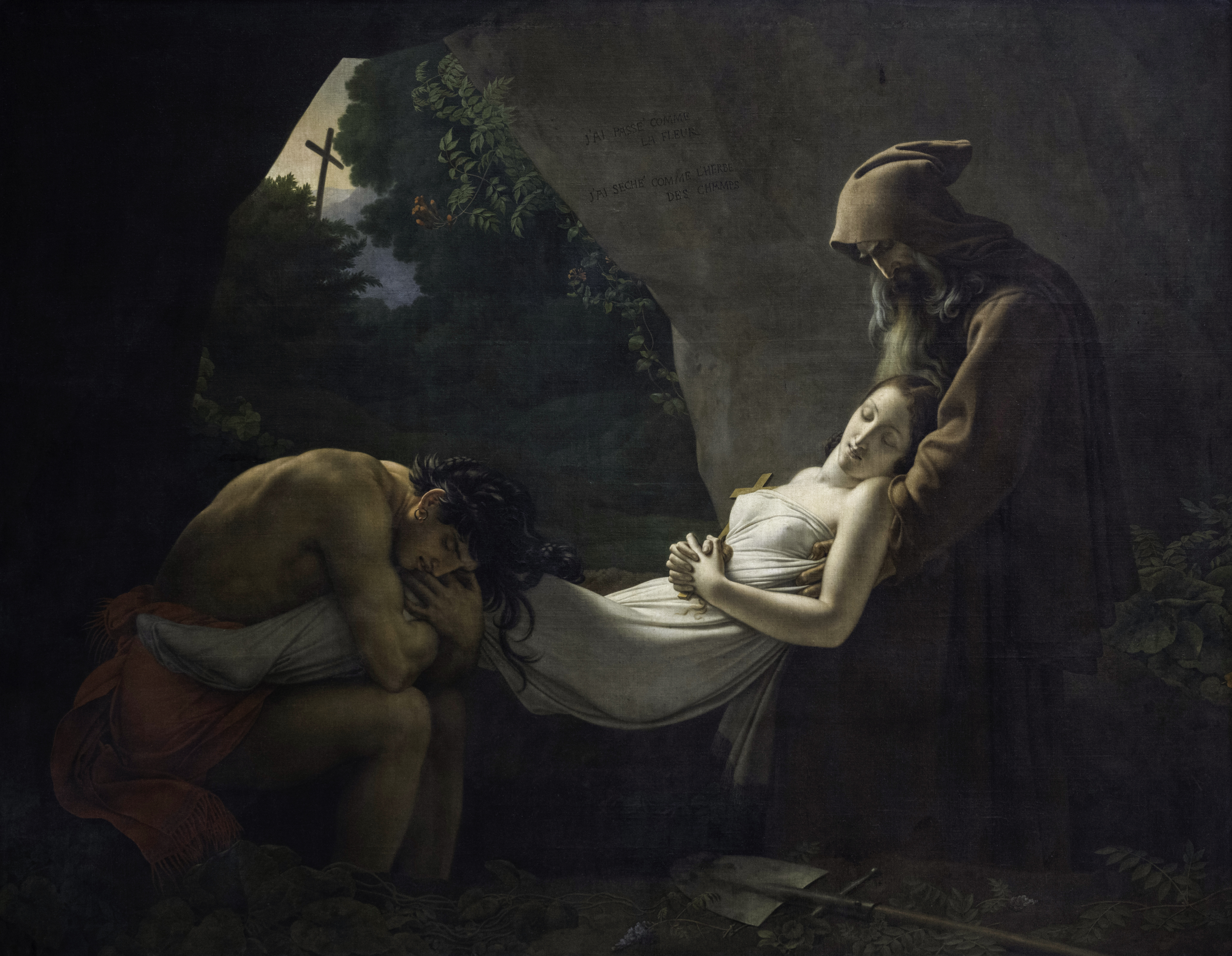
The Burial of Atala by Girodet

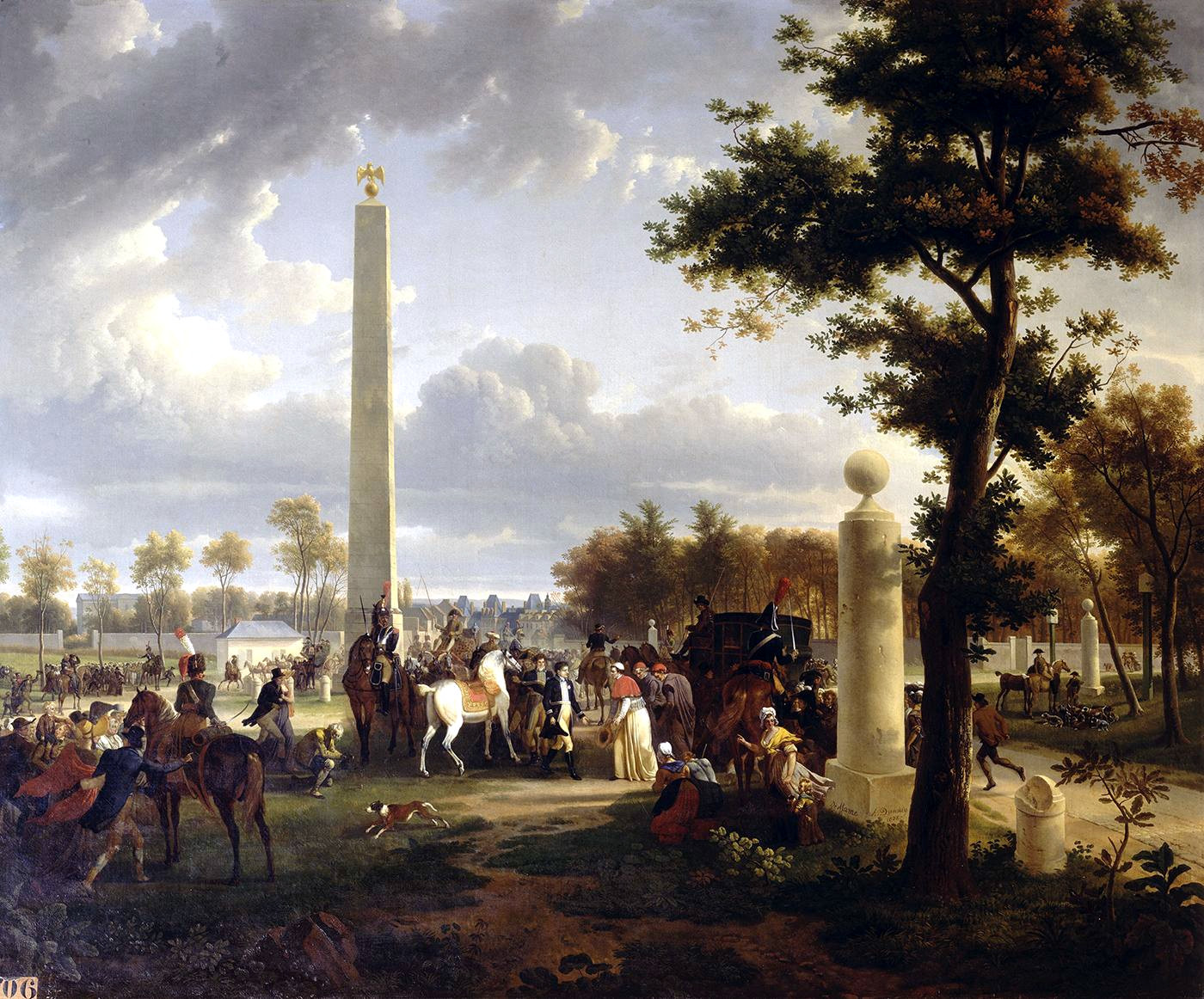
Meeting between Napoleon and Pope Pius VII in Fontainebleau Forest by Jean-Louis de Marne

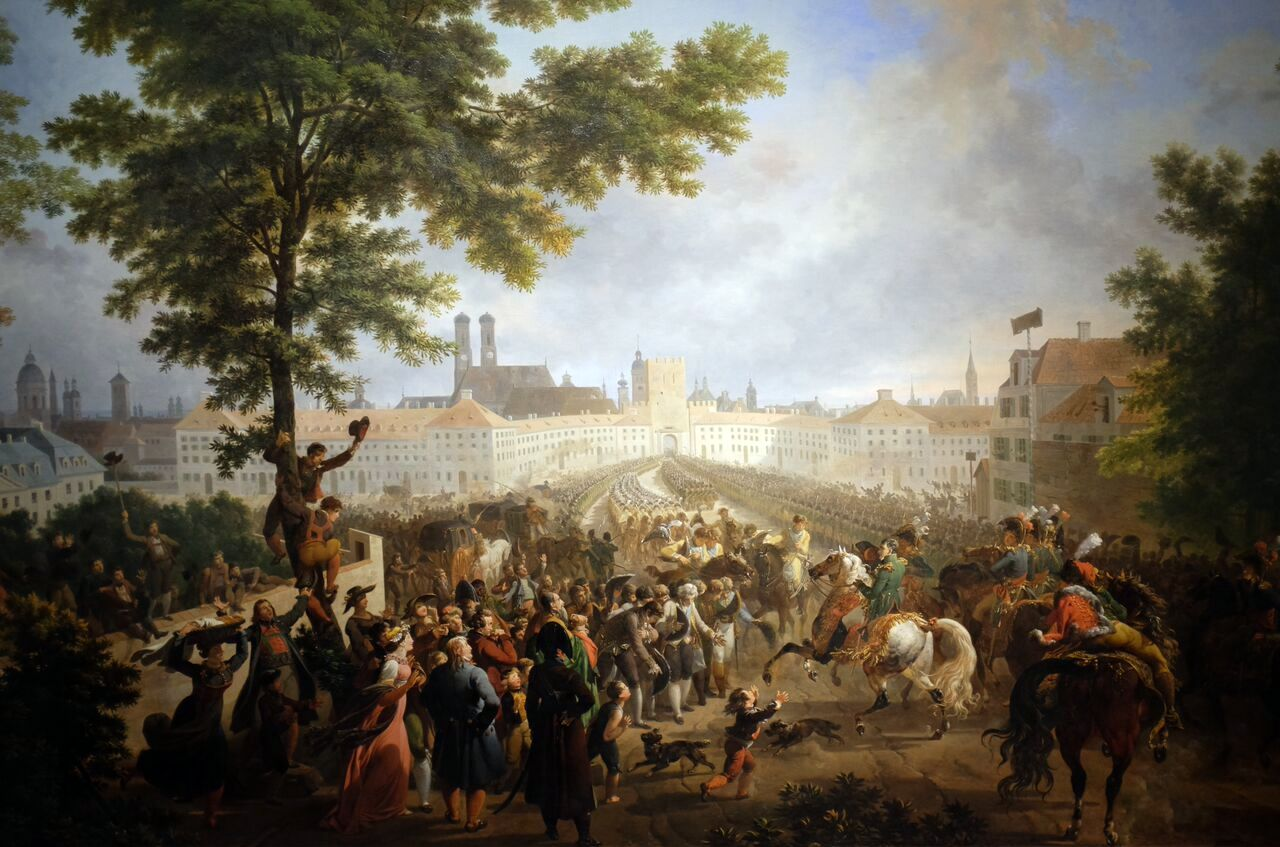
Entry of the French Army into Munich by Nicolas-Antoine Taunay

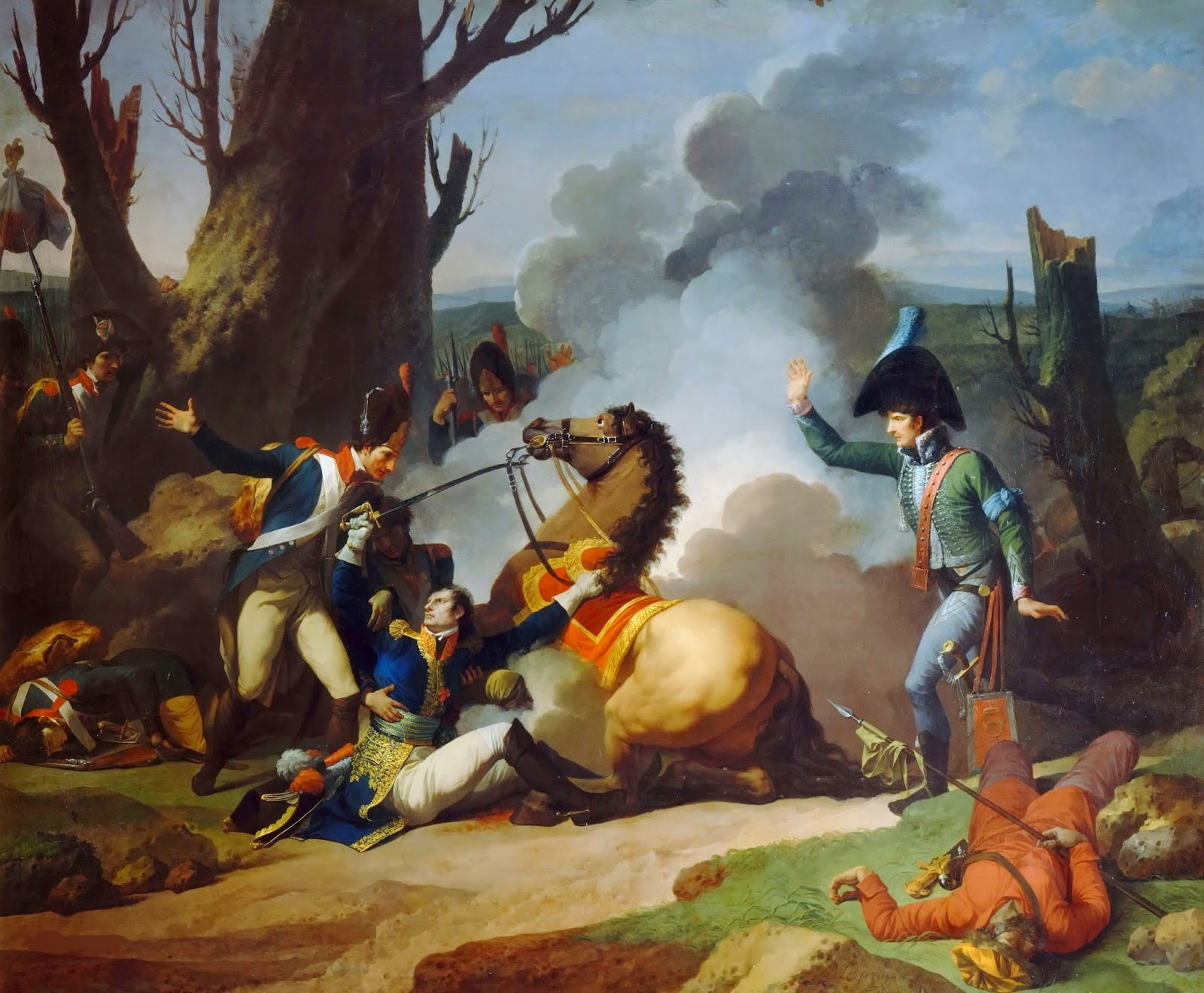
The Death of General Valhubert by Jean-François Pierre Peyron

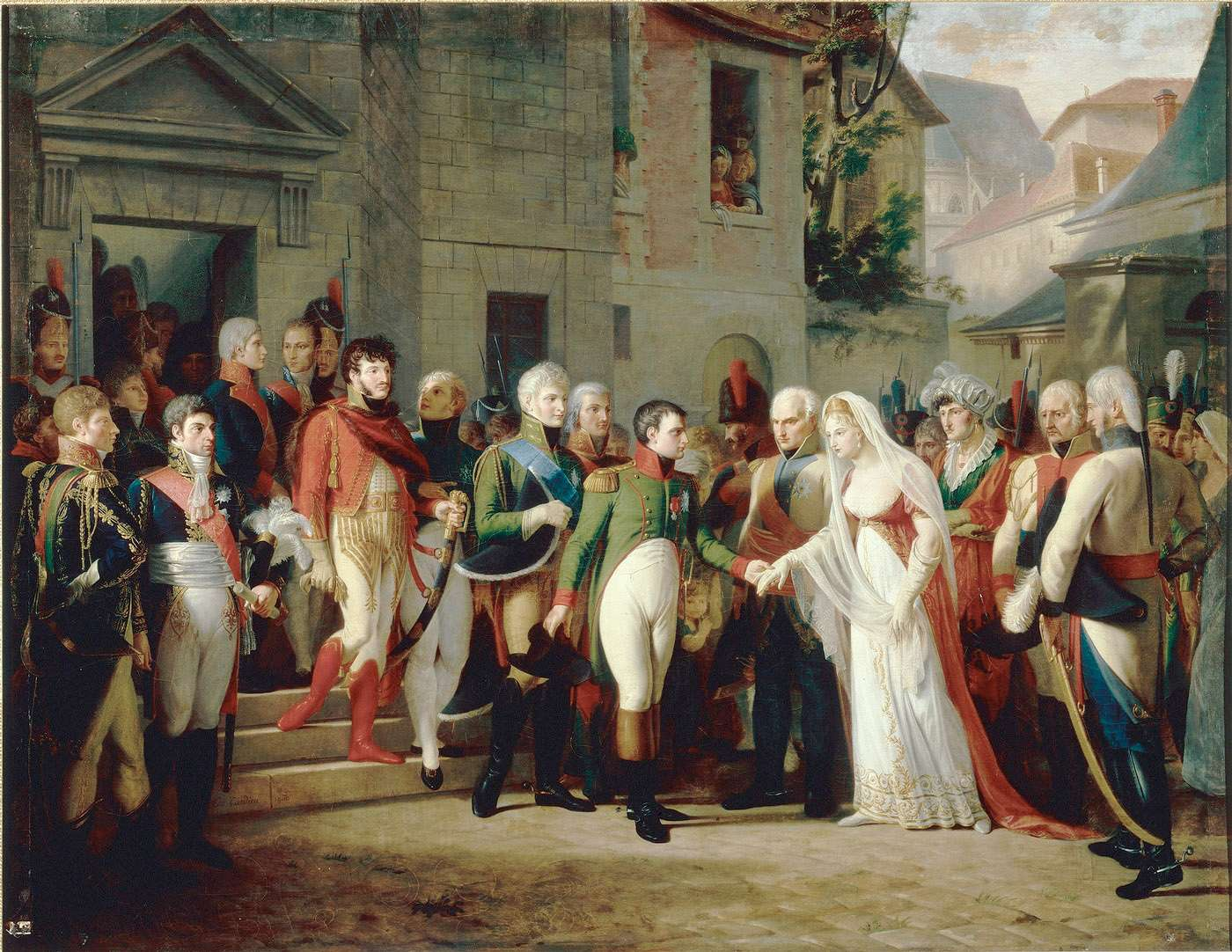
Napoleon Receives the Queen of Prussia at Tilsit by Jean-Charles Tardieu

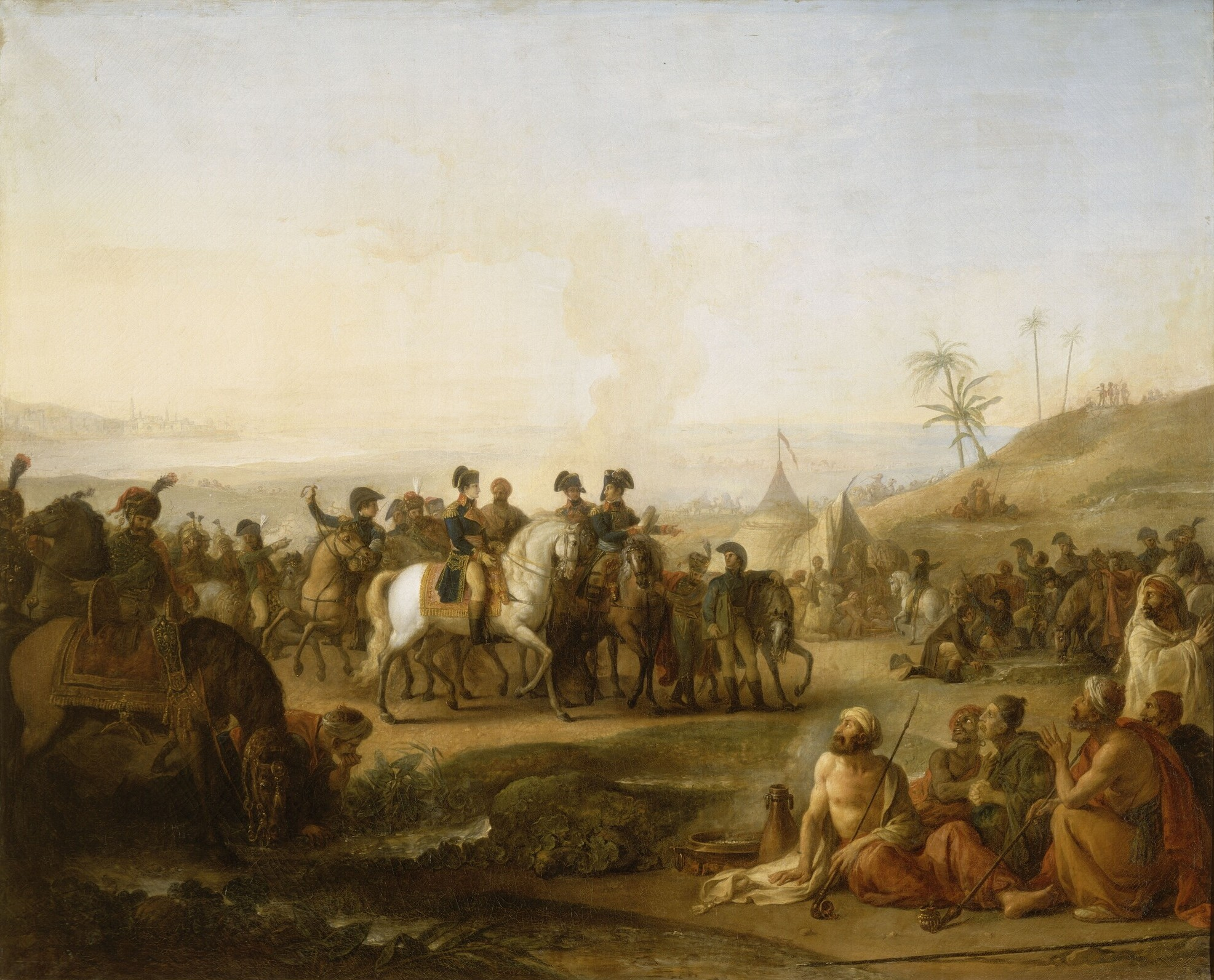
Bonapare Visiting the Fountains of Moses in 1798 by Jean-Simon Berthélemy

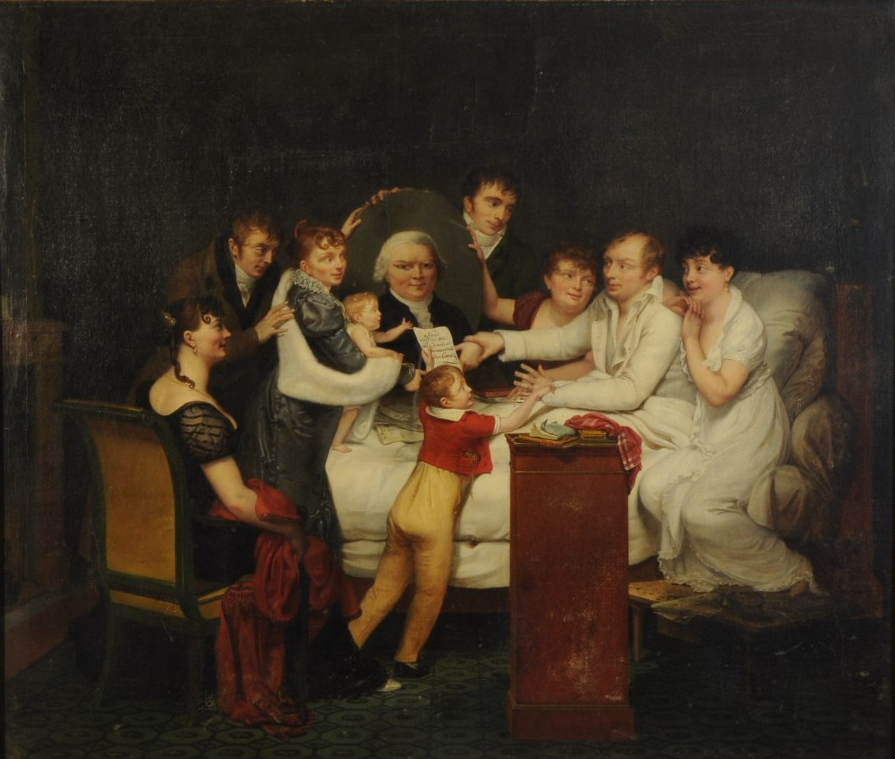
Monsieur Picard and His Family by Pauline Auzou

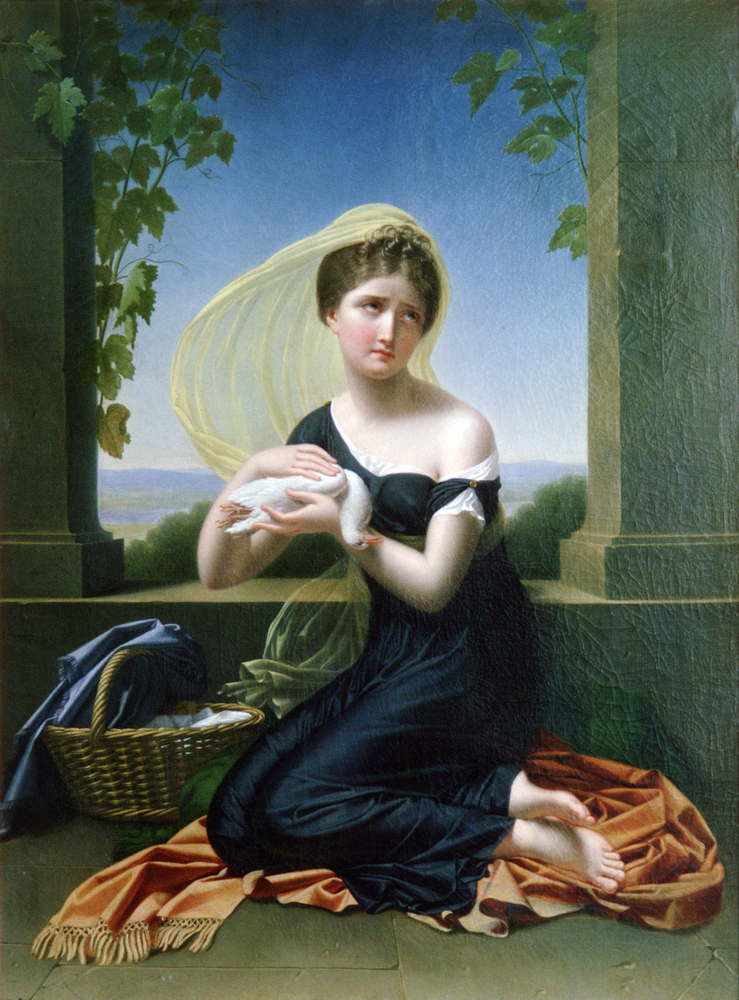
Une jeune fille pleurant son pigeon mort by Jeanne-Elisabeth Chaudet

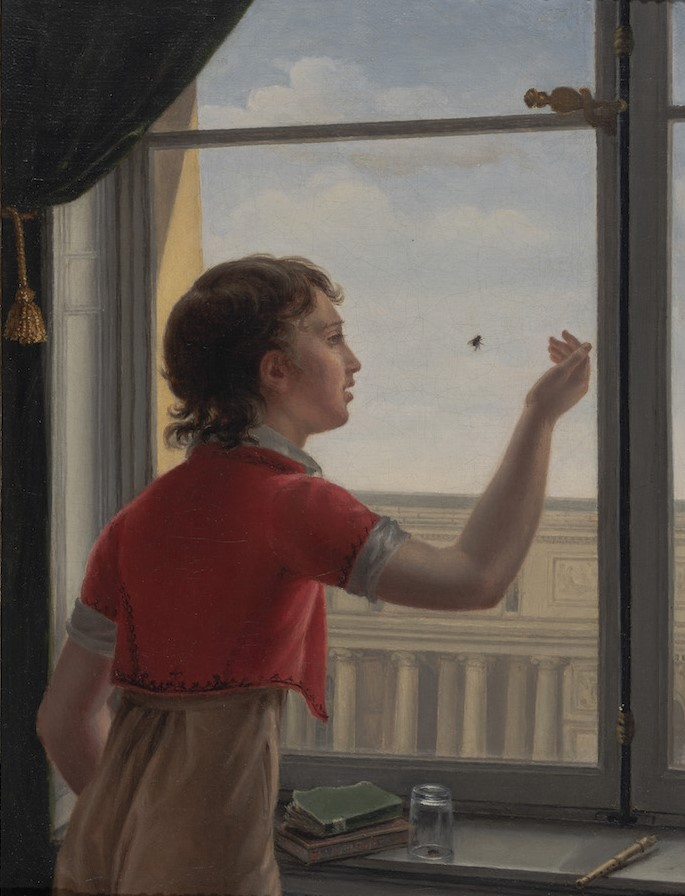
The Fly Catcher by Isabelle Pinson

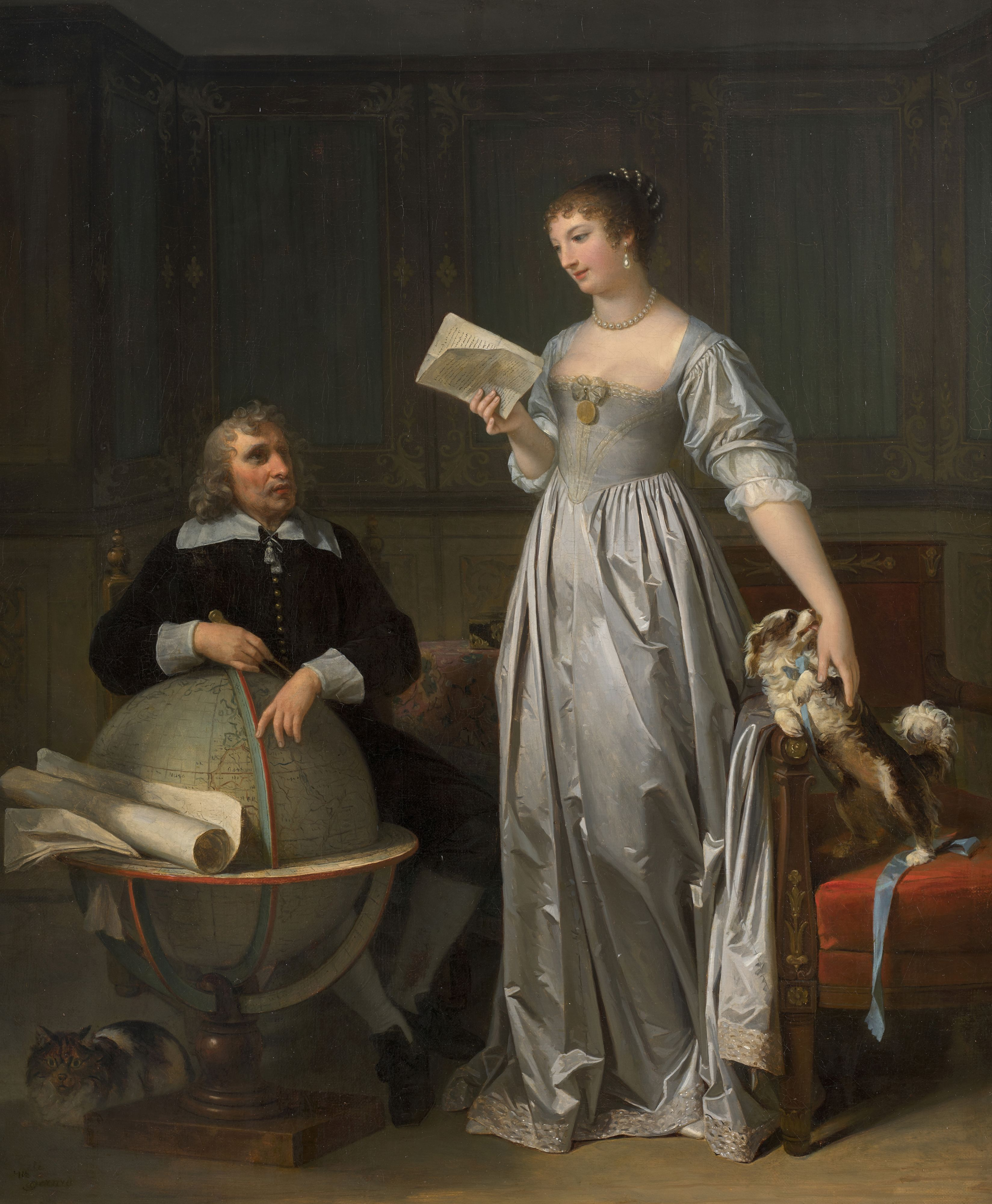
A Young Woman Just Received a Letter from Her Husband by Marguerite Gérard

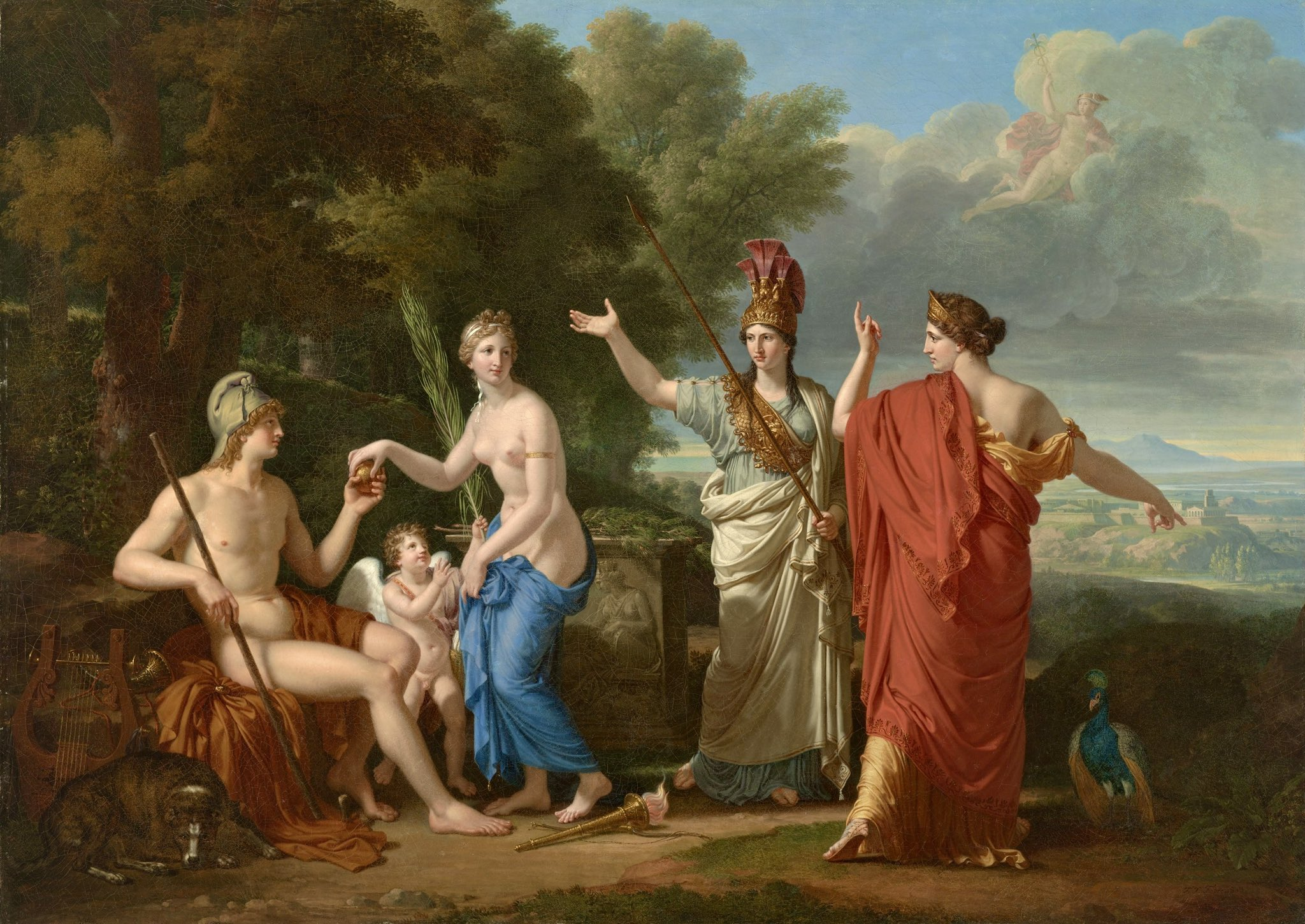
The Judgement of Paris by François-Xavier Fabre

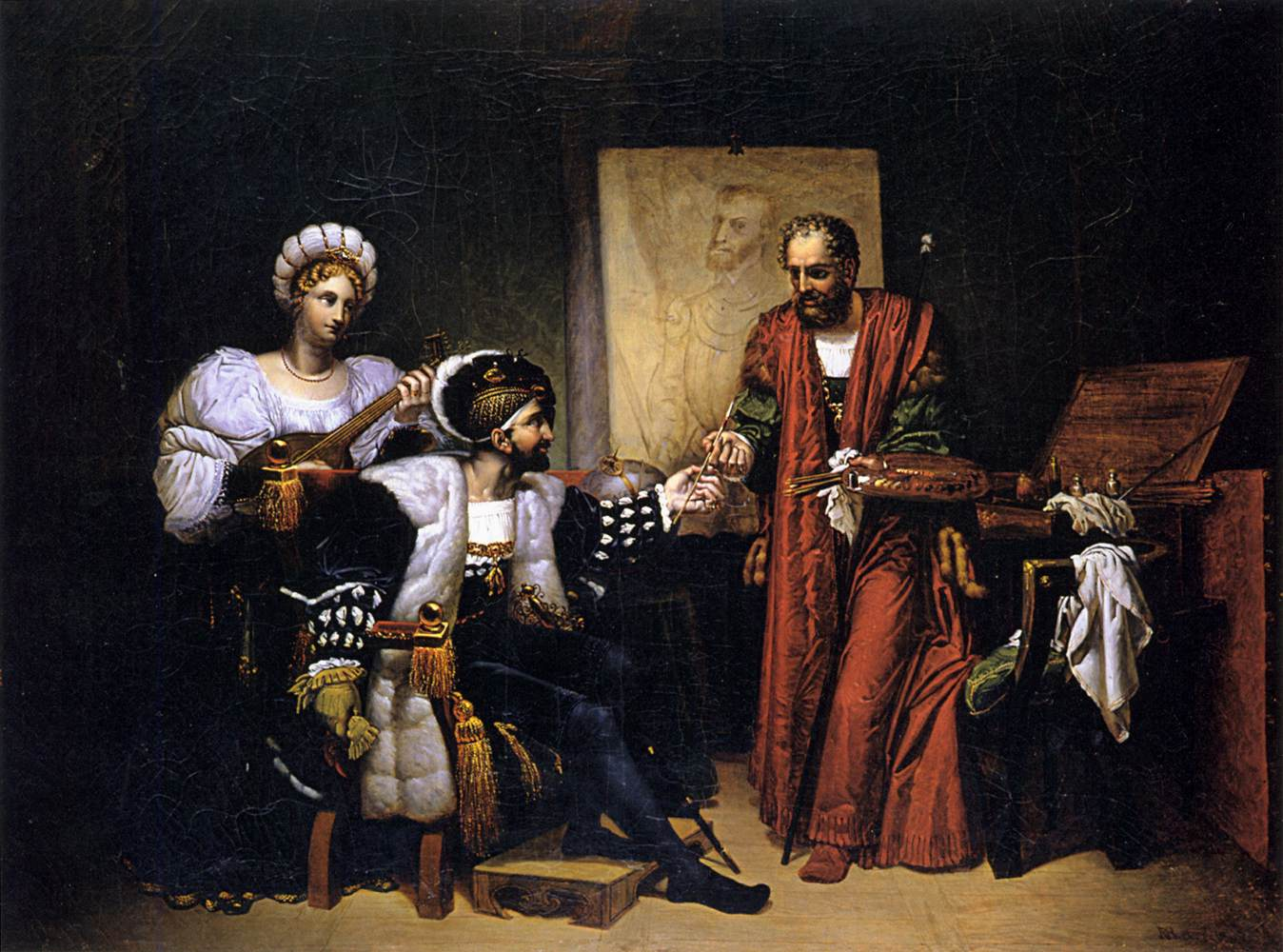
Charles V Picking up Titian's Paintbrush by Pierre-Nolasque Bergeret

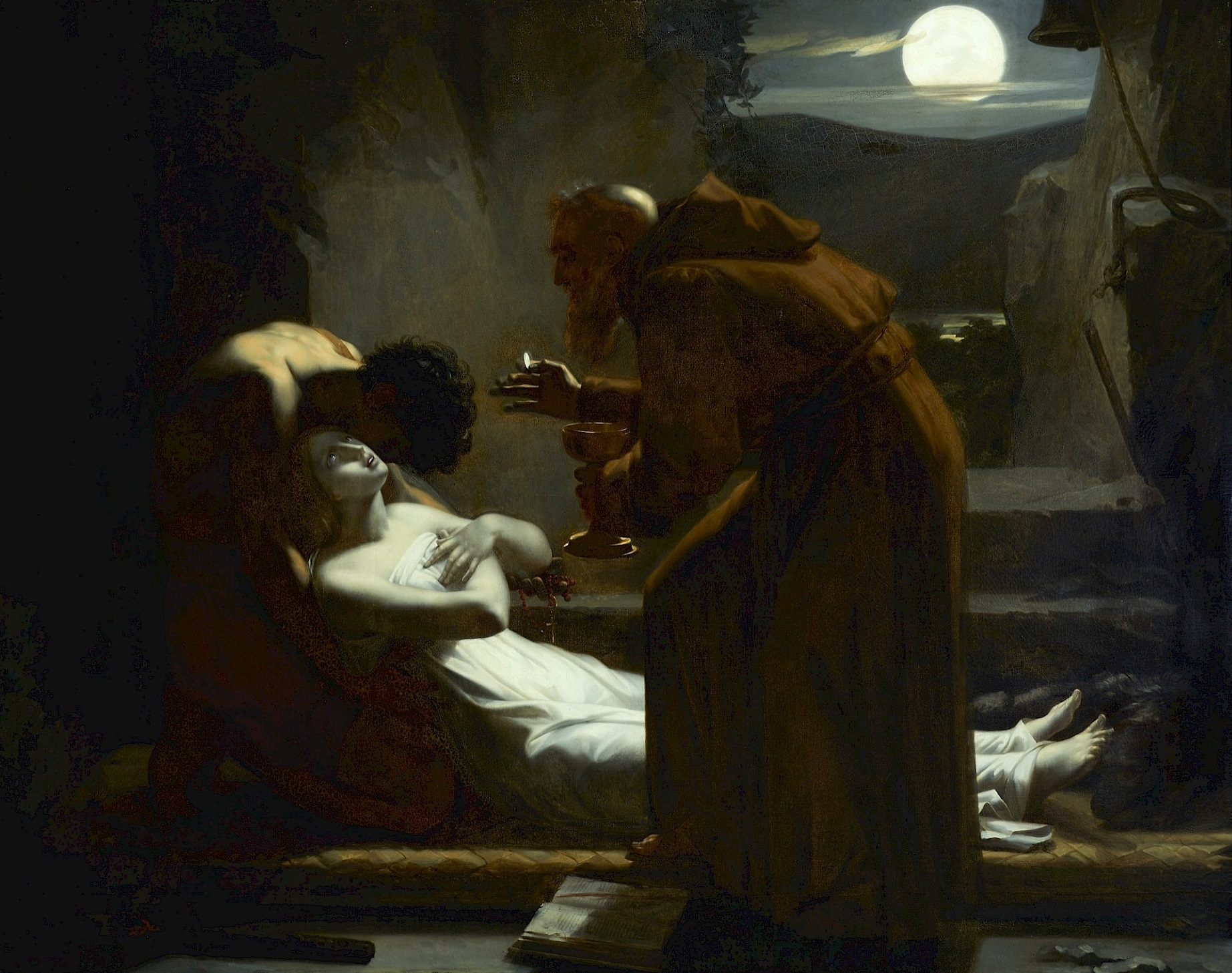
The Last Communion of Atala by Pierre Jérôme Lordon

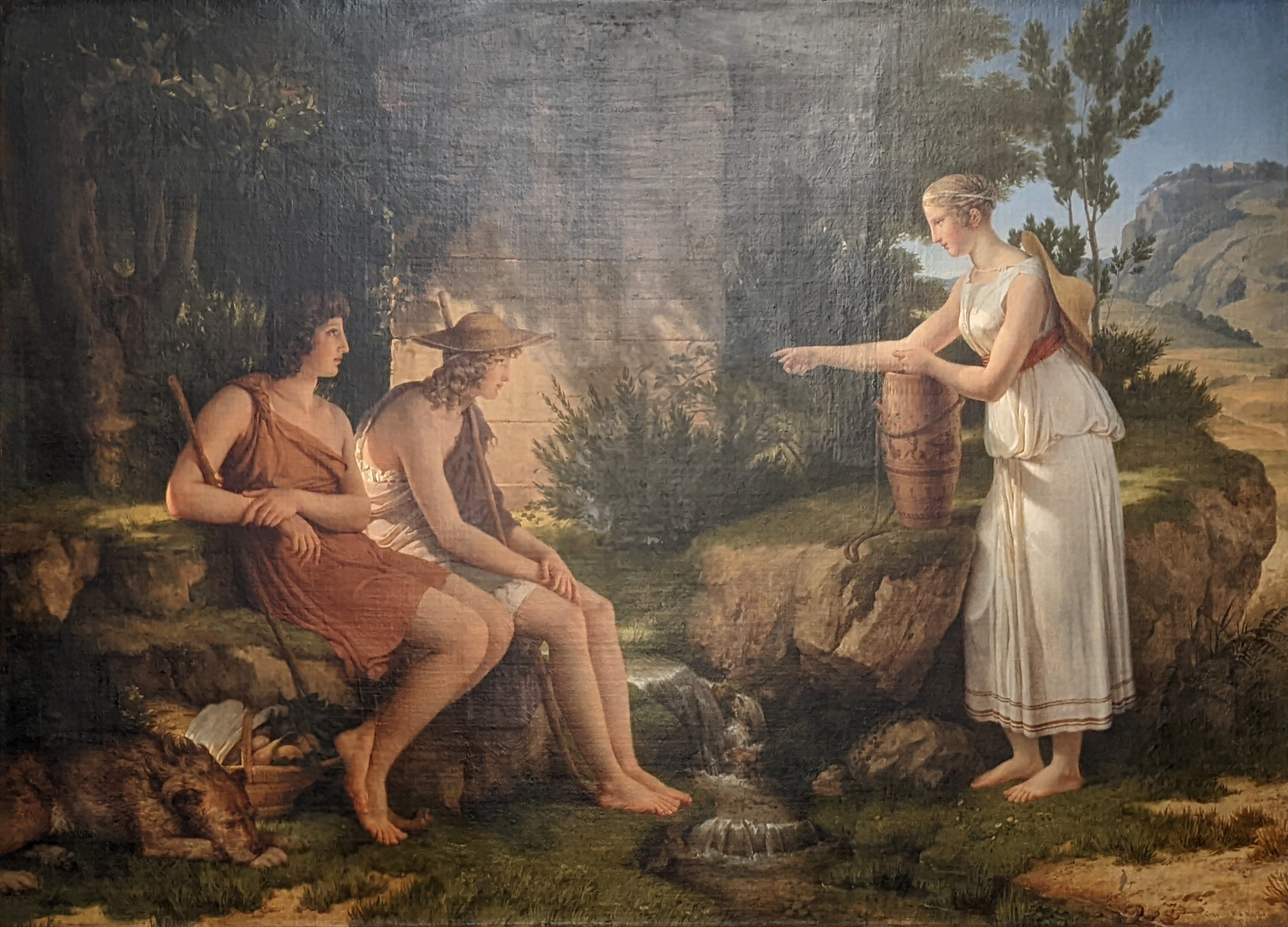
The Shepherds at the Tomb of Amyntas by Pierre-Narcisse Guérin

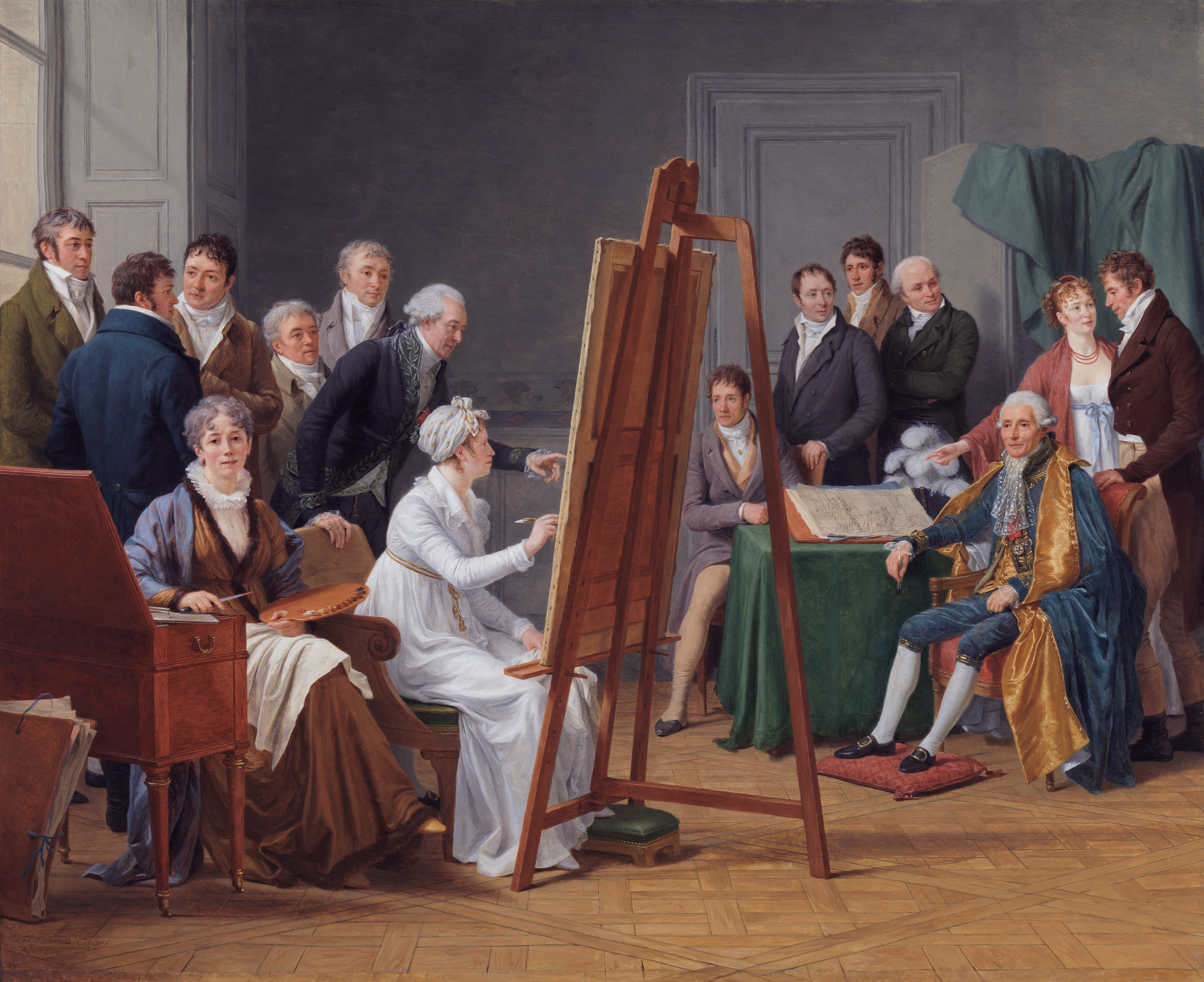
Studio Scene by Marie-Gabrielle Capet

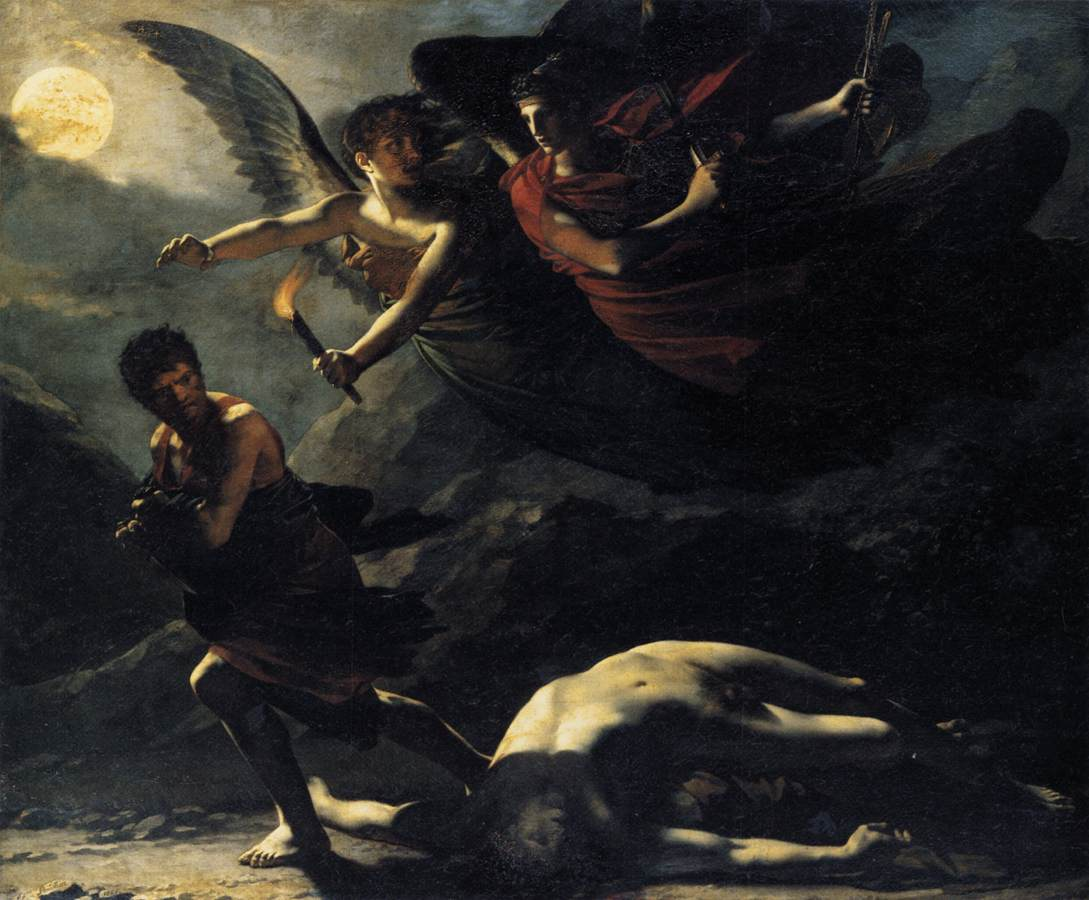
Justice and Divine Vengeance Pursuing Crime by Pierre-Paul Prud'hon

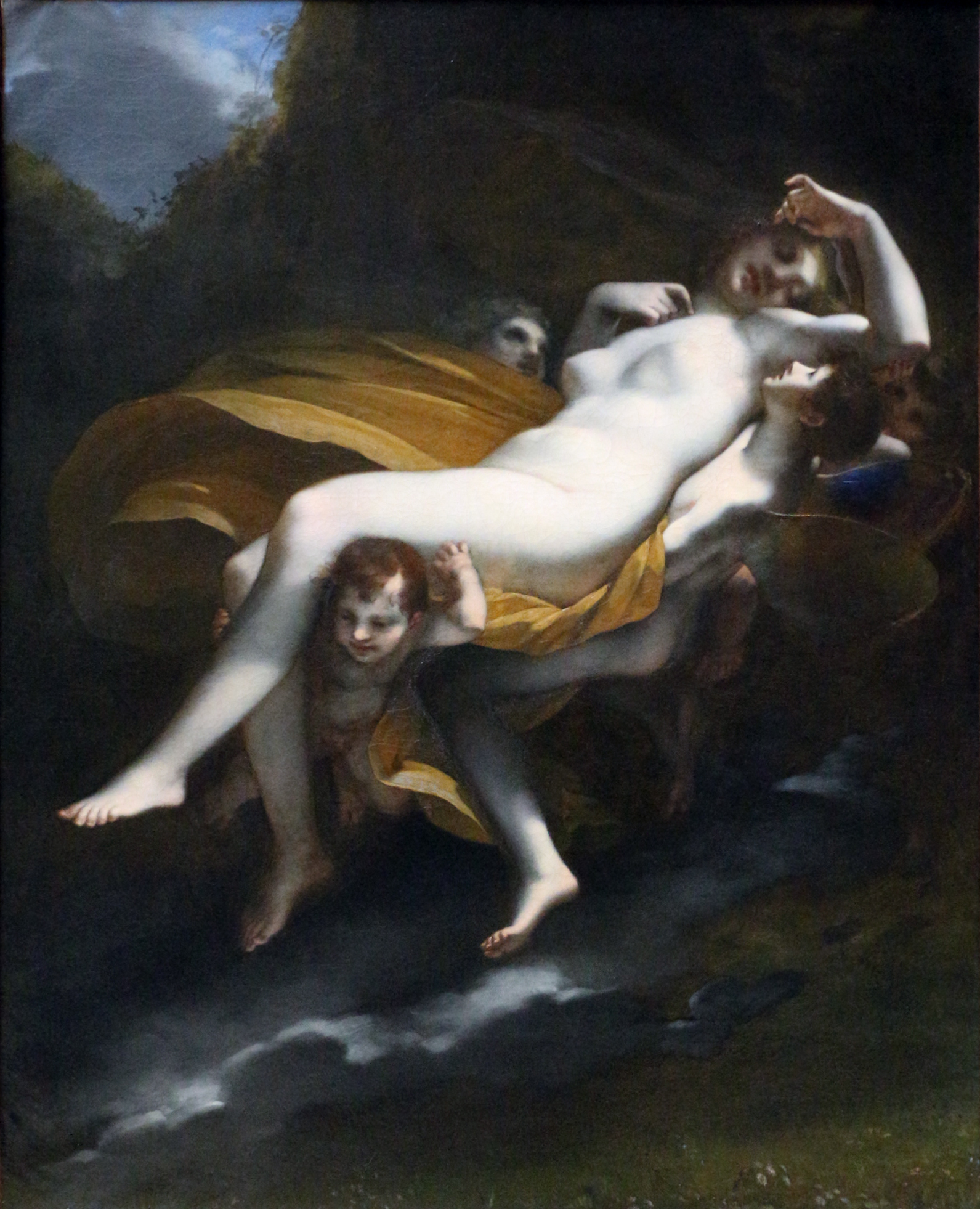
The Abduction of Psyche by Pierre-Paul Prud'hon

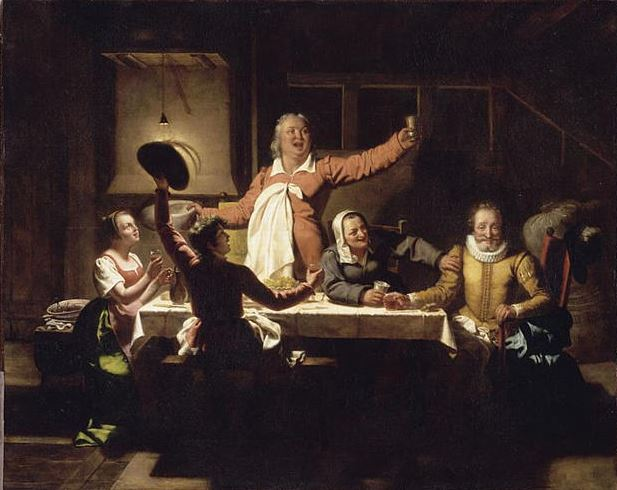
Henry IV Having Dinner with the Miller, Michaud by Alexandre Menjaud

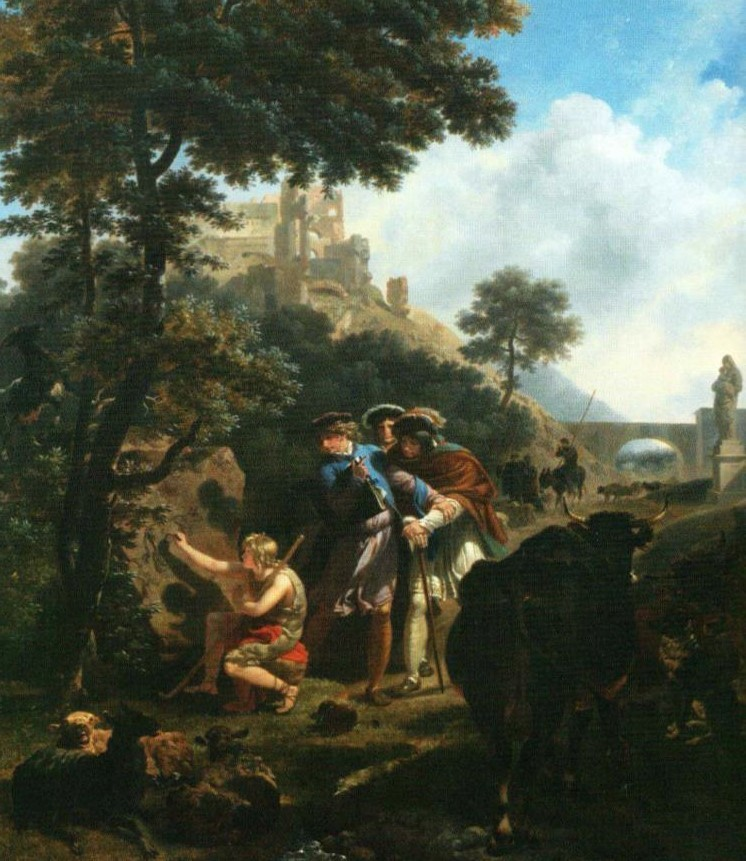
Cimabue and Giotto by Nicolas-Antoine Taunay

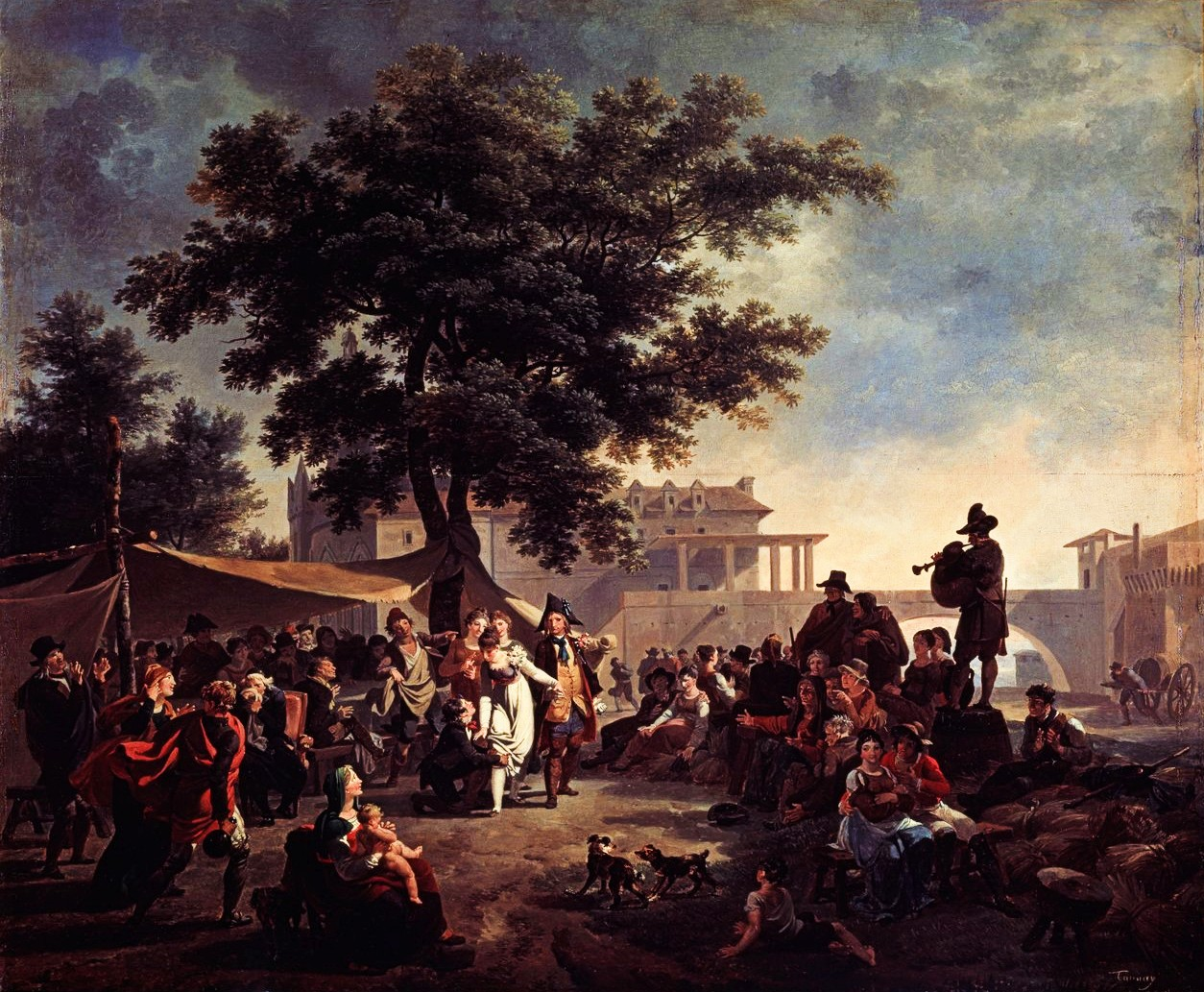
The Bride's Garter by Nicolas-Antoine Taunay

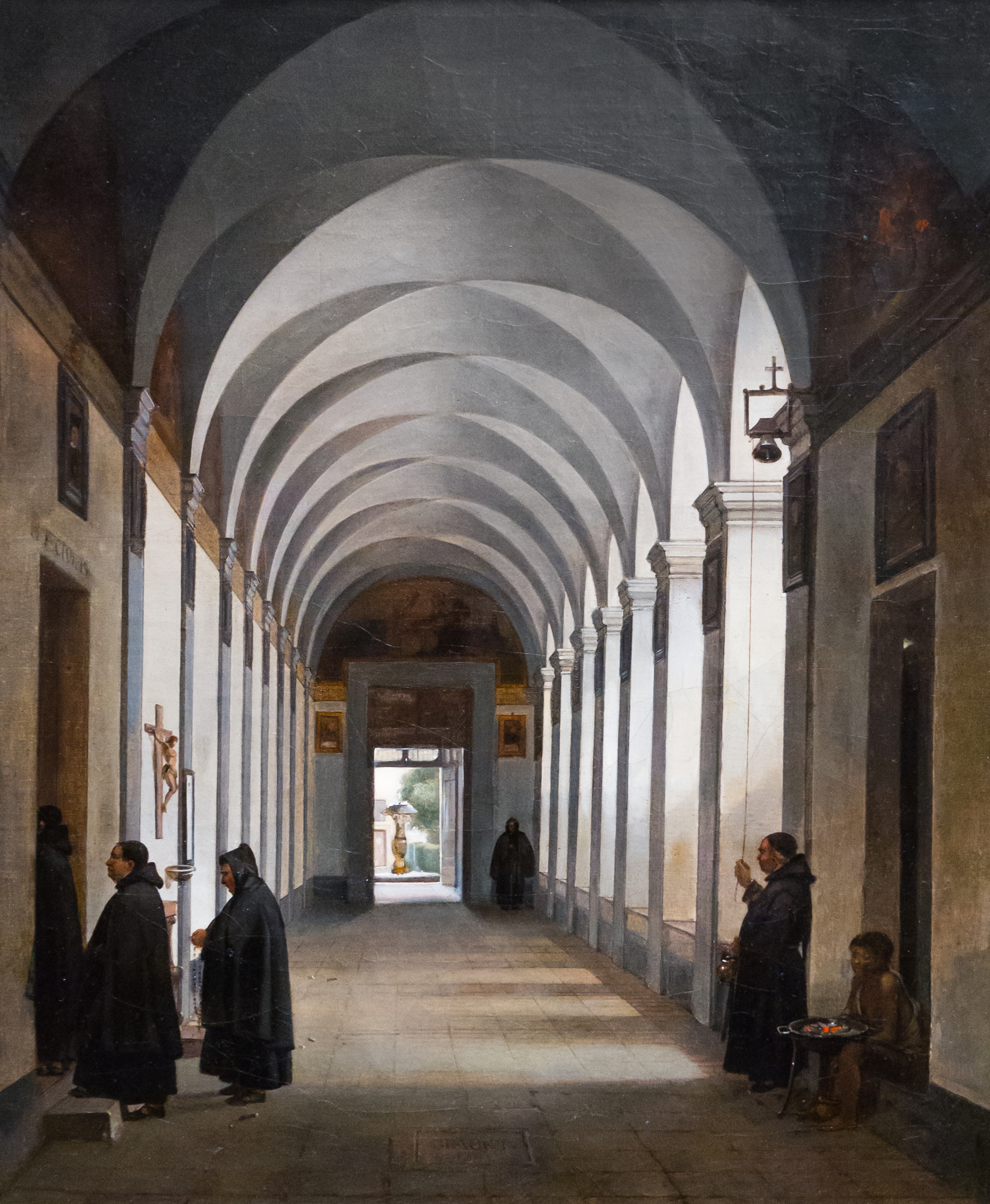
Monks in the Cloister of the Church of Gesù e Maria, Rome by François Marius Granet

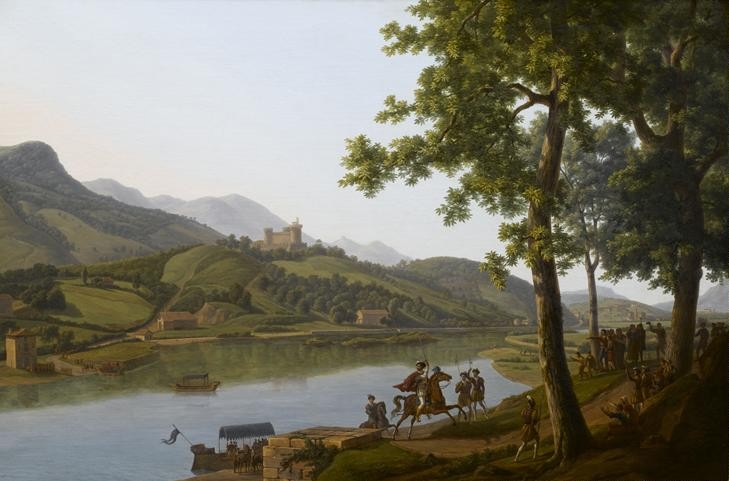
View of the River Bidassoa by Alexandre Millin du Perreux

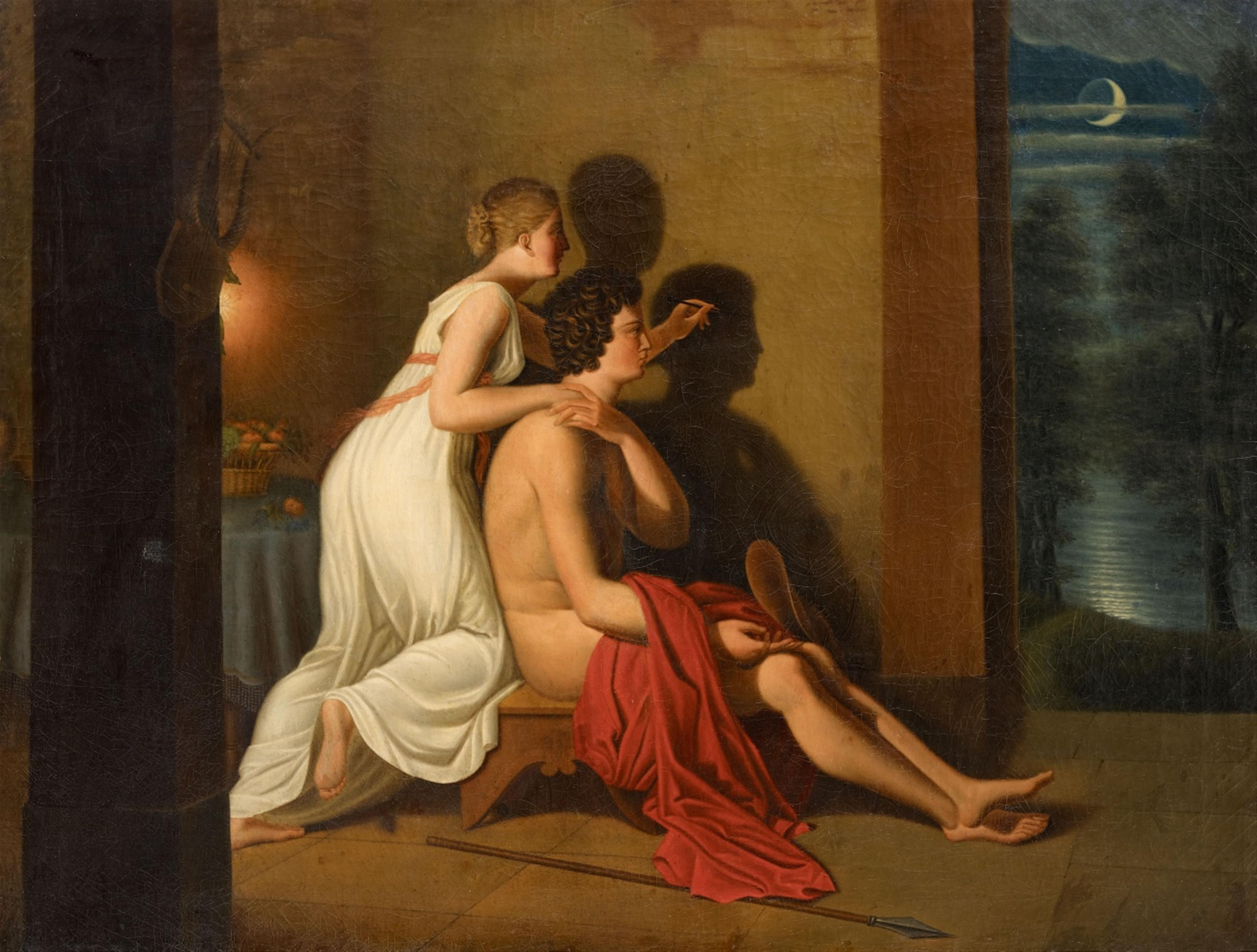
The Invention of Painting by Louis Ducis

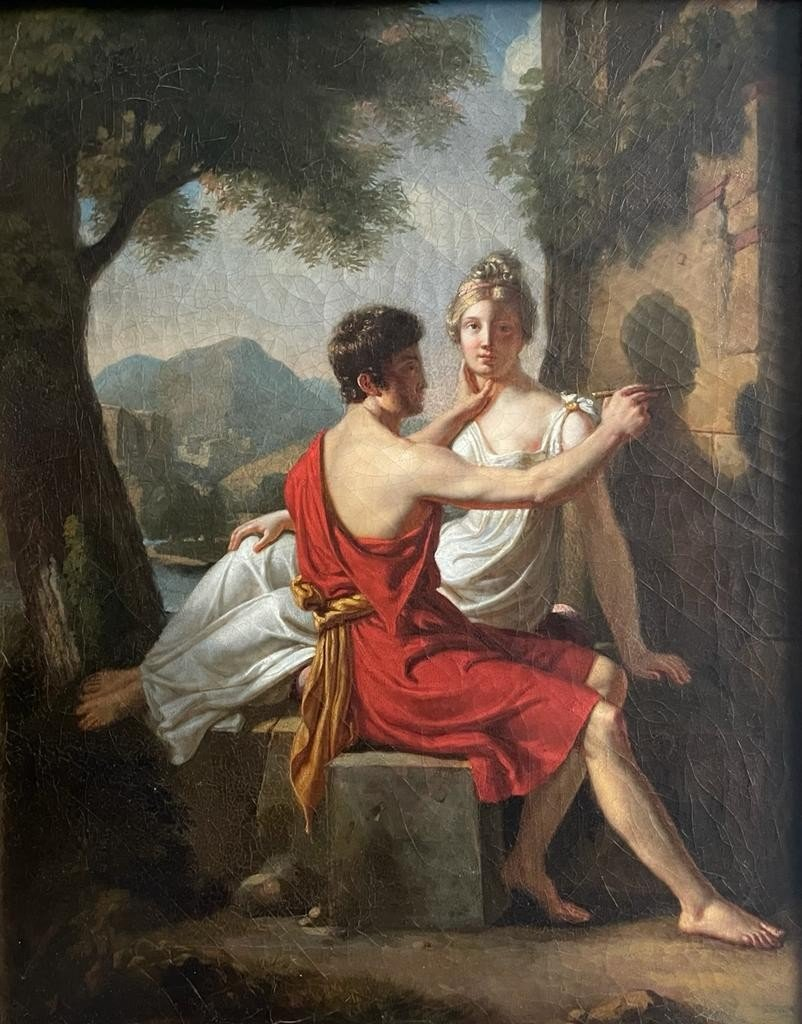
The Origin of Painting by Antoine-Claude Fleury

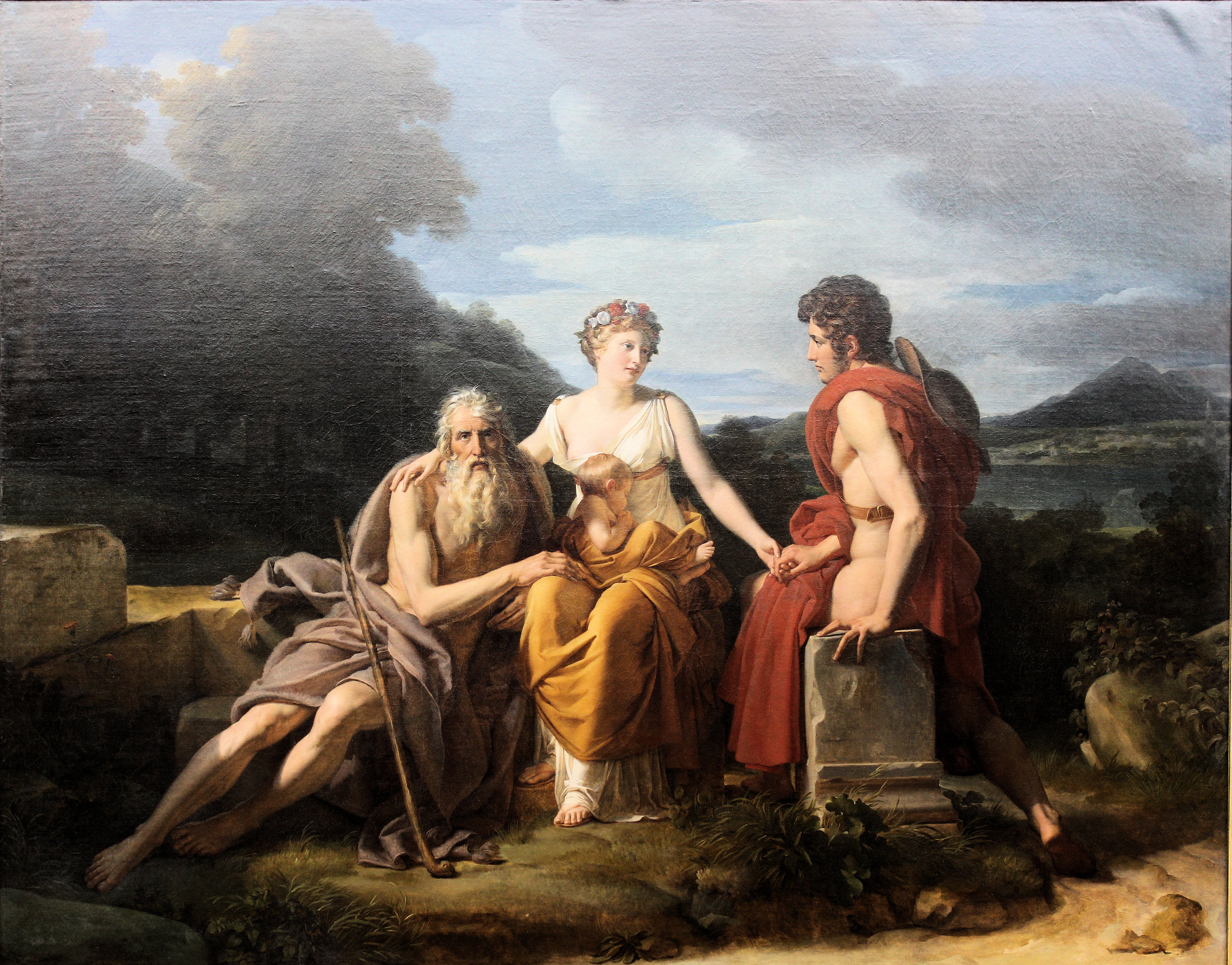
The Three Ages by François Gérard

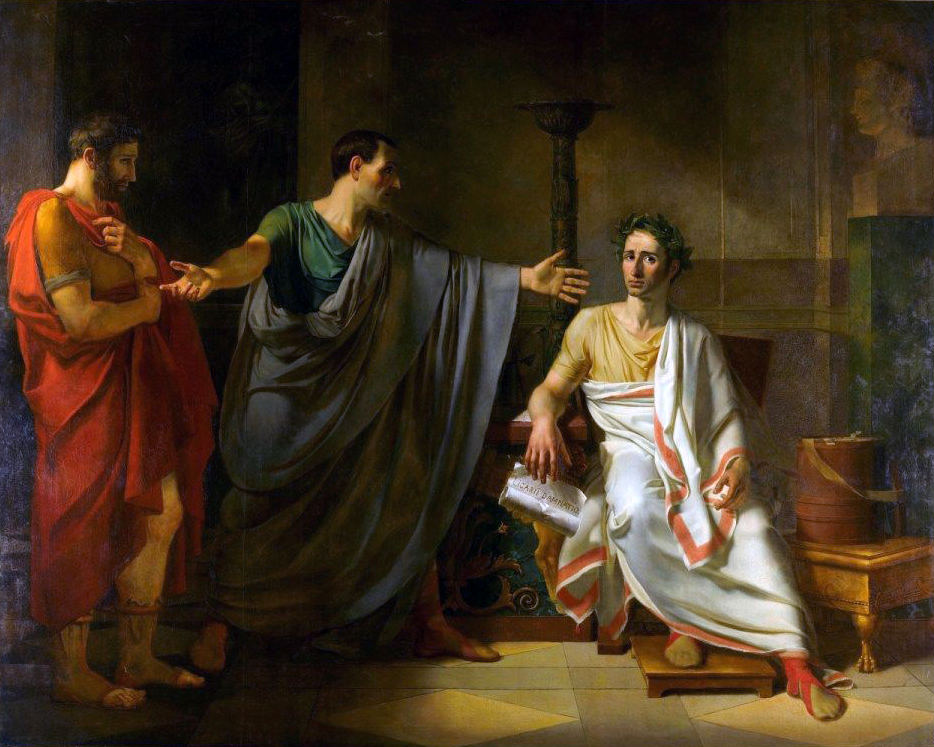
The Clemency of Caesar by Abel de Pujol

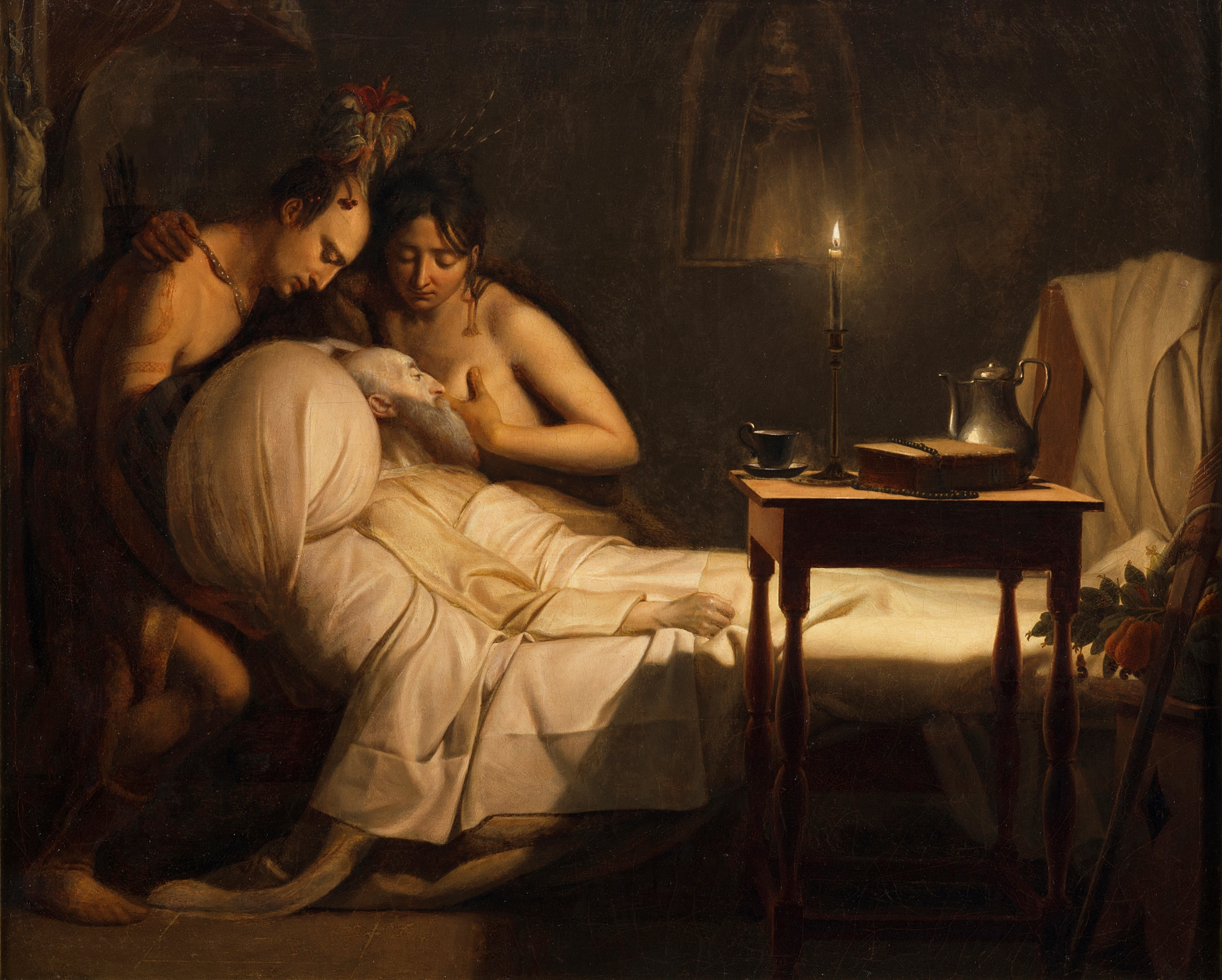
Las Casas malade soigné par les sauvages by Louis Hersent

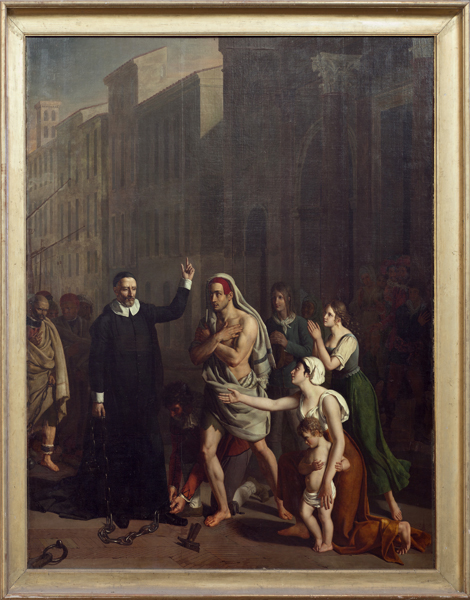
Saint Vincent de Paul Taking the Shackles of a Galley Slave by Fortuné Dufau

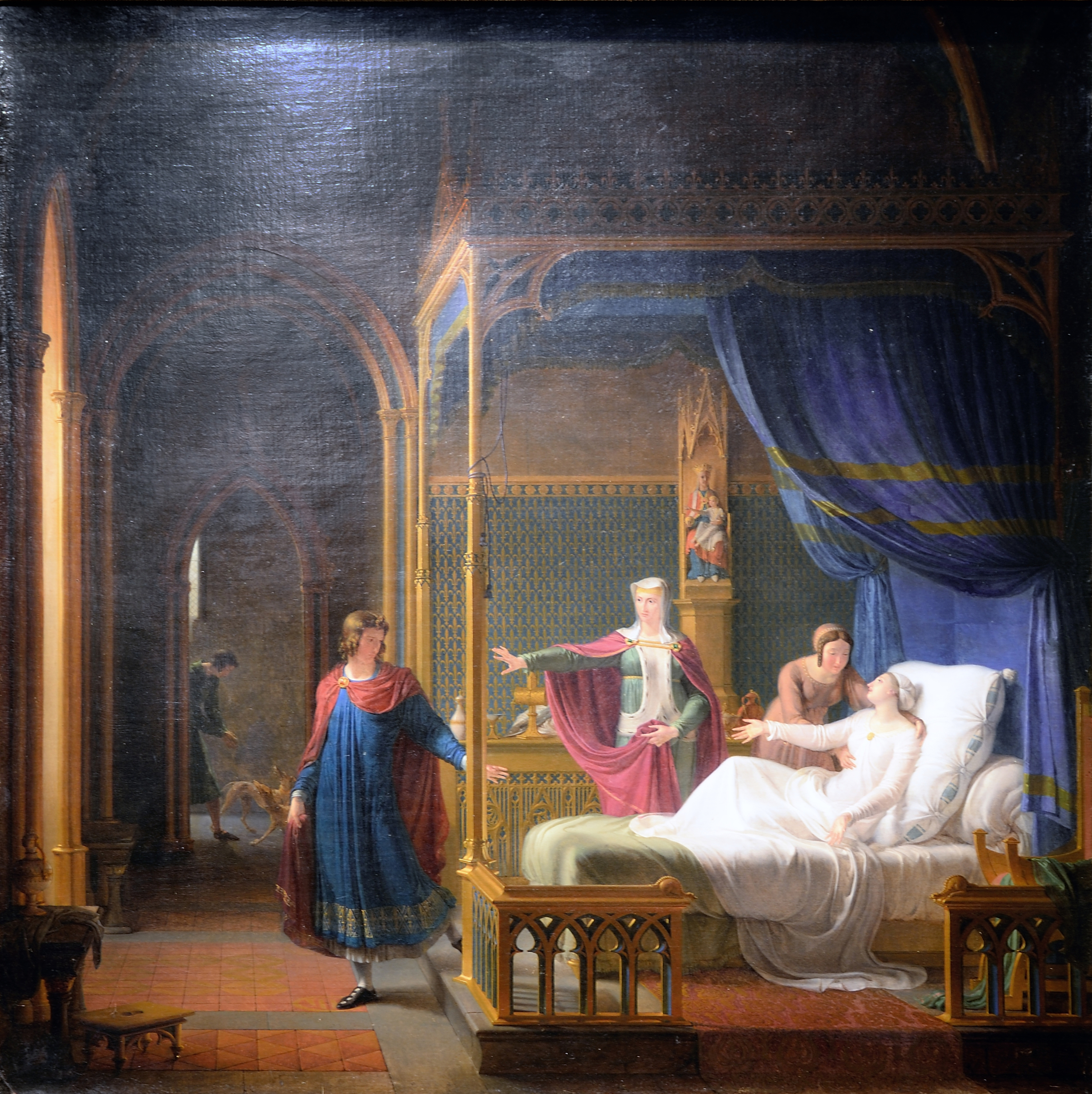
Saint Louis's Deference to His Mother by Fleury François Richard

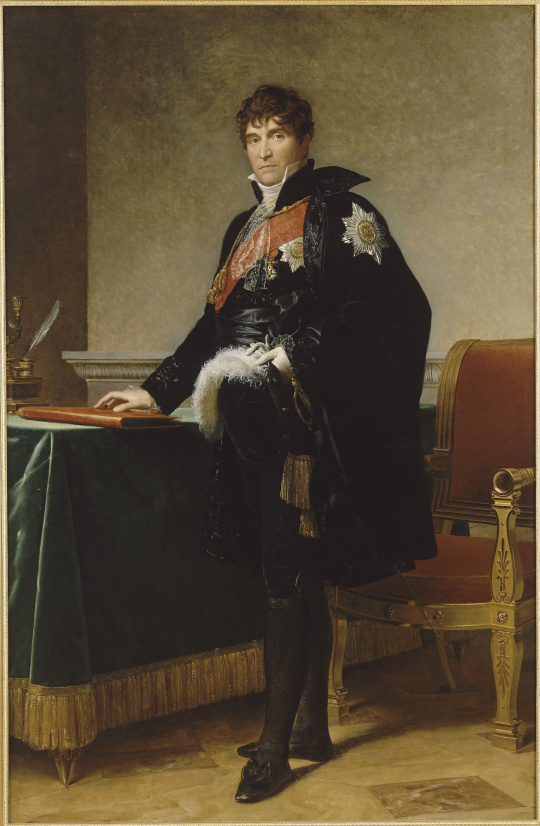
Portrait of Michel-Louis-Étienne Regnaud de Saint-Jean d'Angély by François Gérard

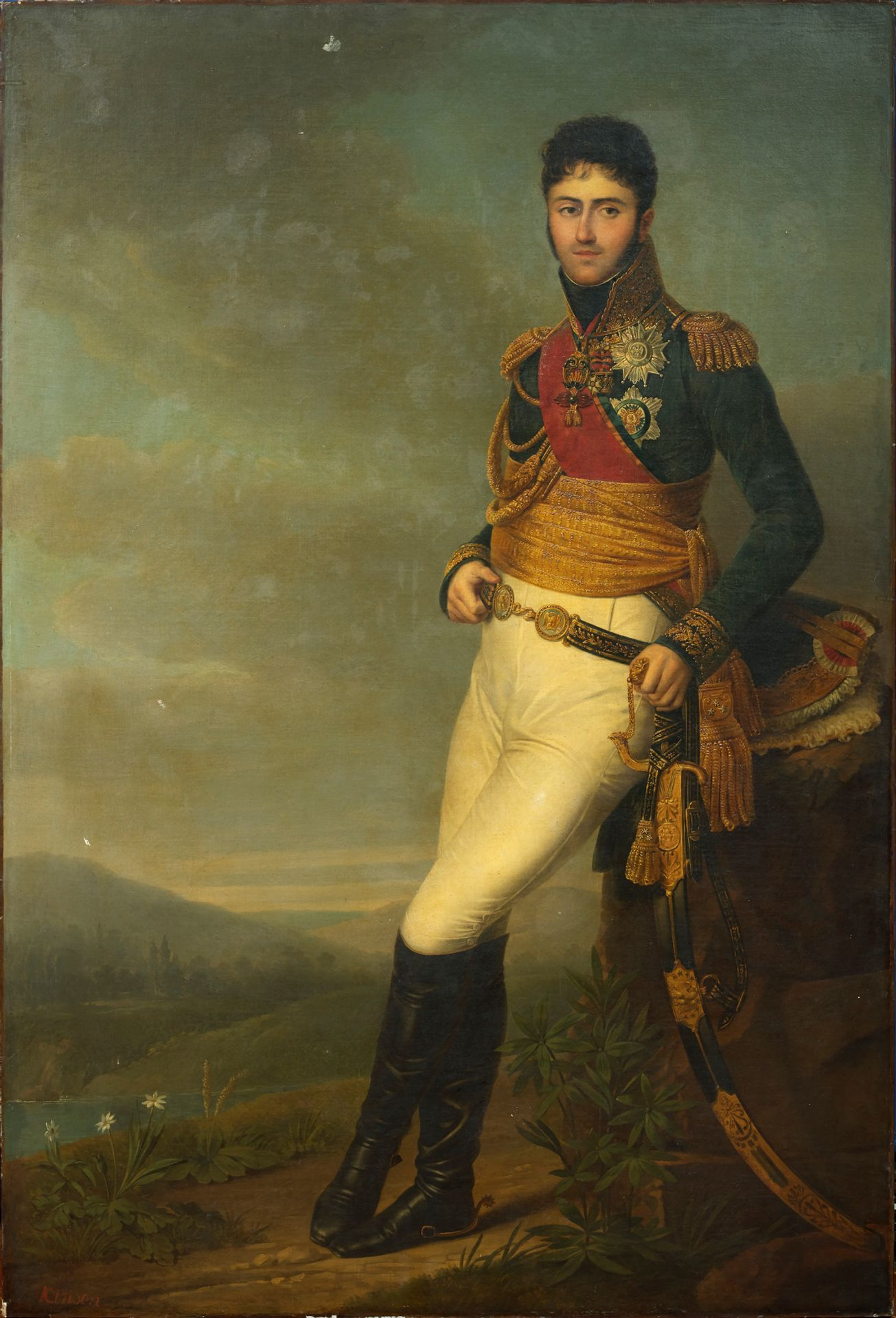
Portrait of Camillo Borghese by François Kinson

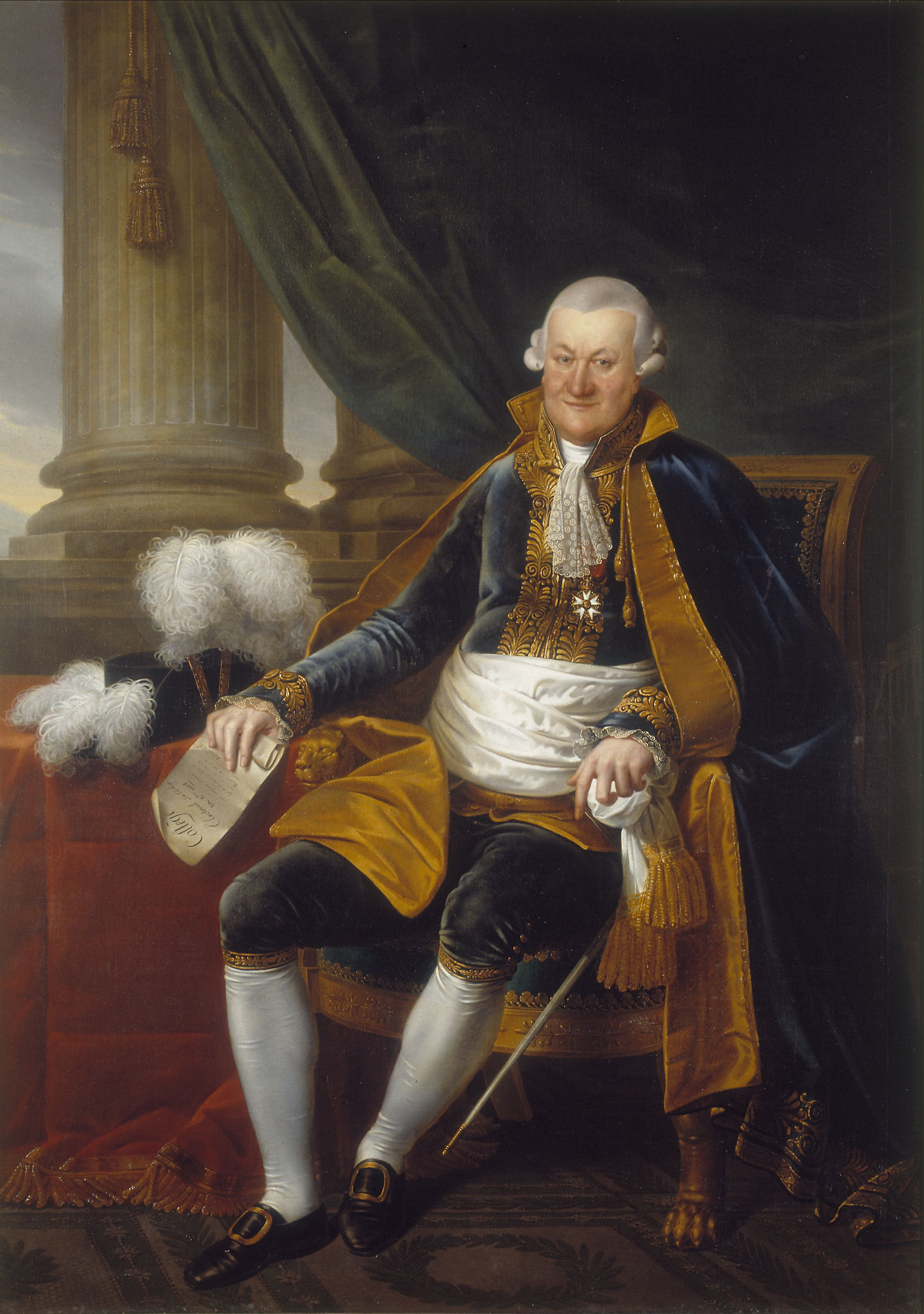
Portrait Justin de Viry by François Kinson

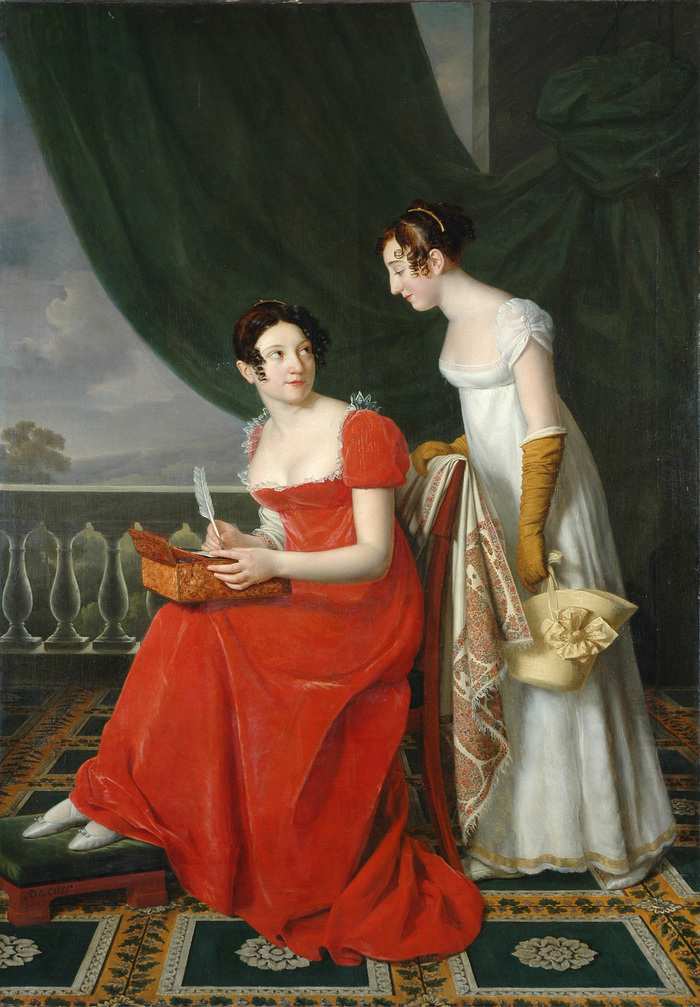
Portrait of Madame Riesener and Her Sister by Henri-François Riesener

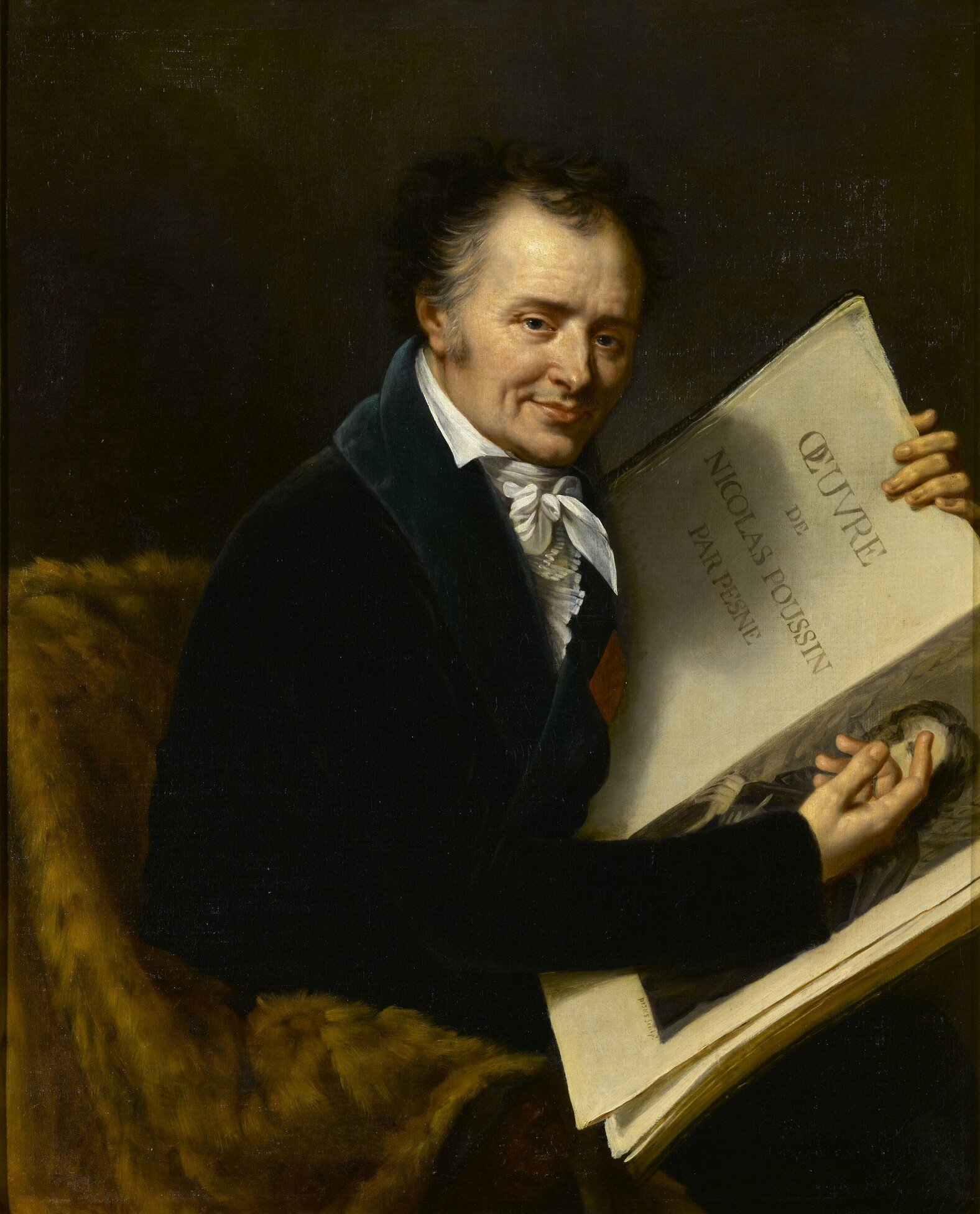
Portrait of Vivant Denon by Robert Lefèvre

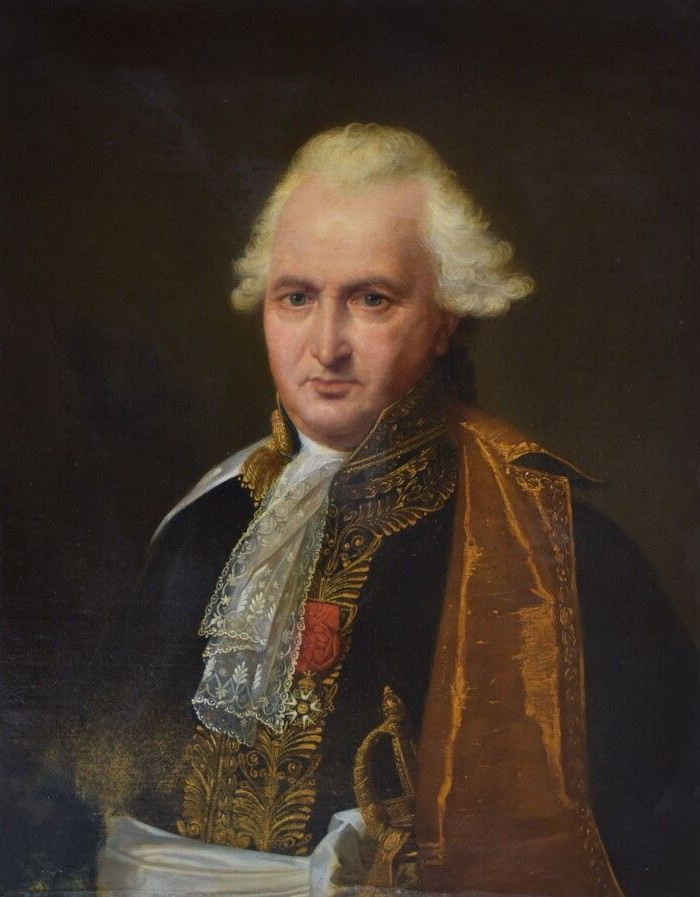
Portrait of Jean-Baptiste Lebrun de Rochemont by Robert Lefèvre

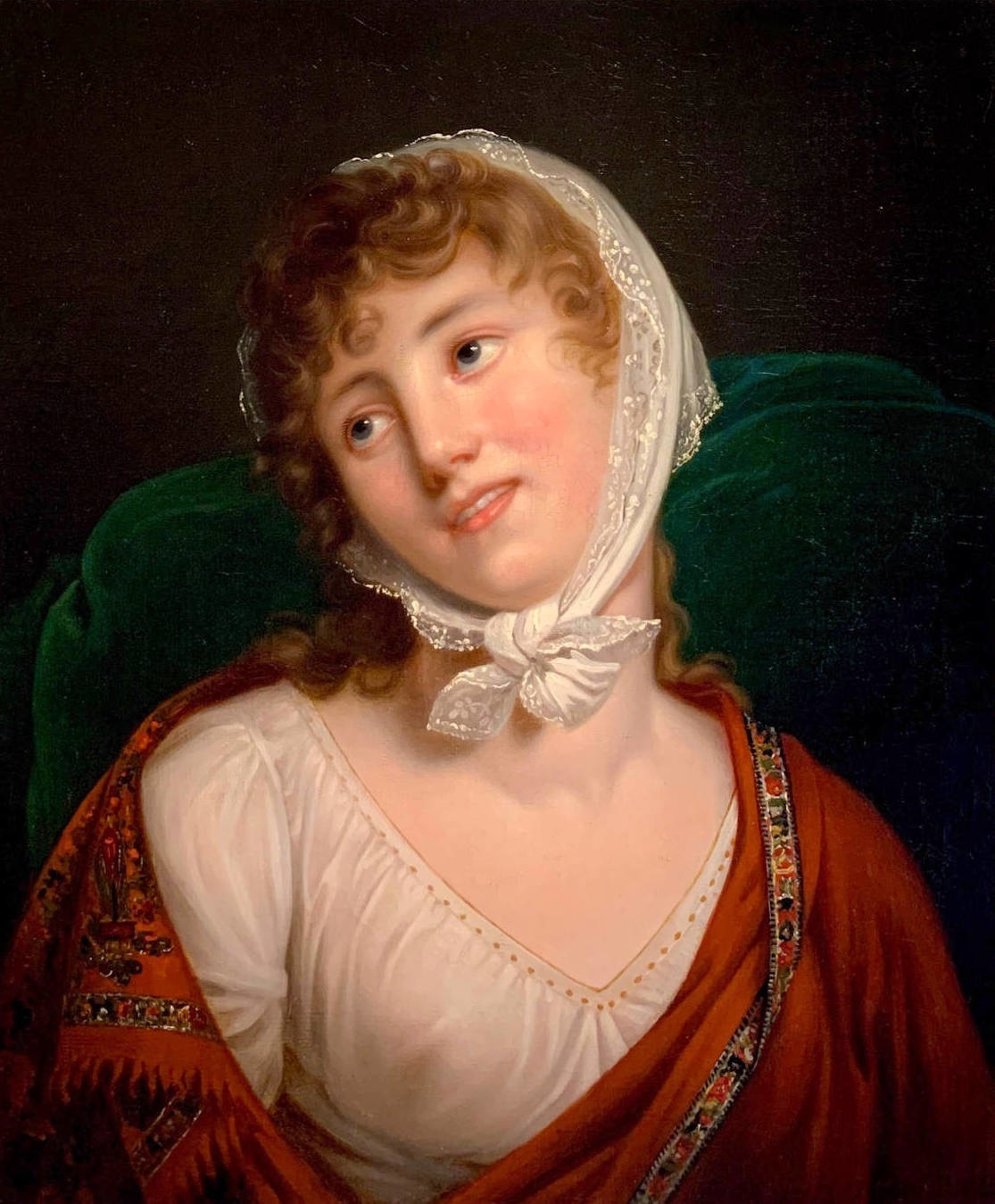
Portrait of Marie Walewska by Robert Lefèvre

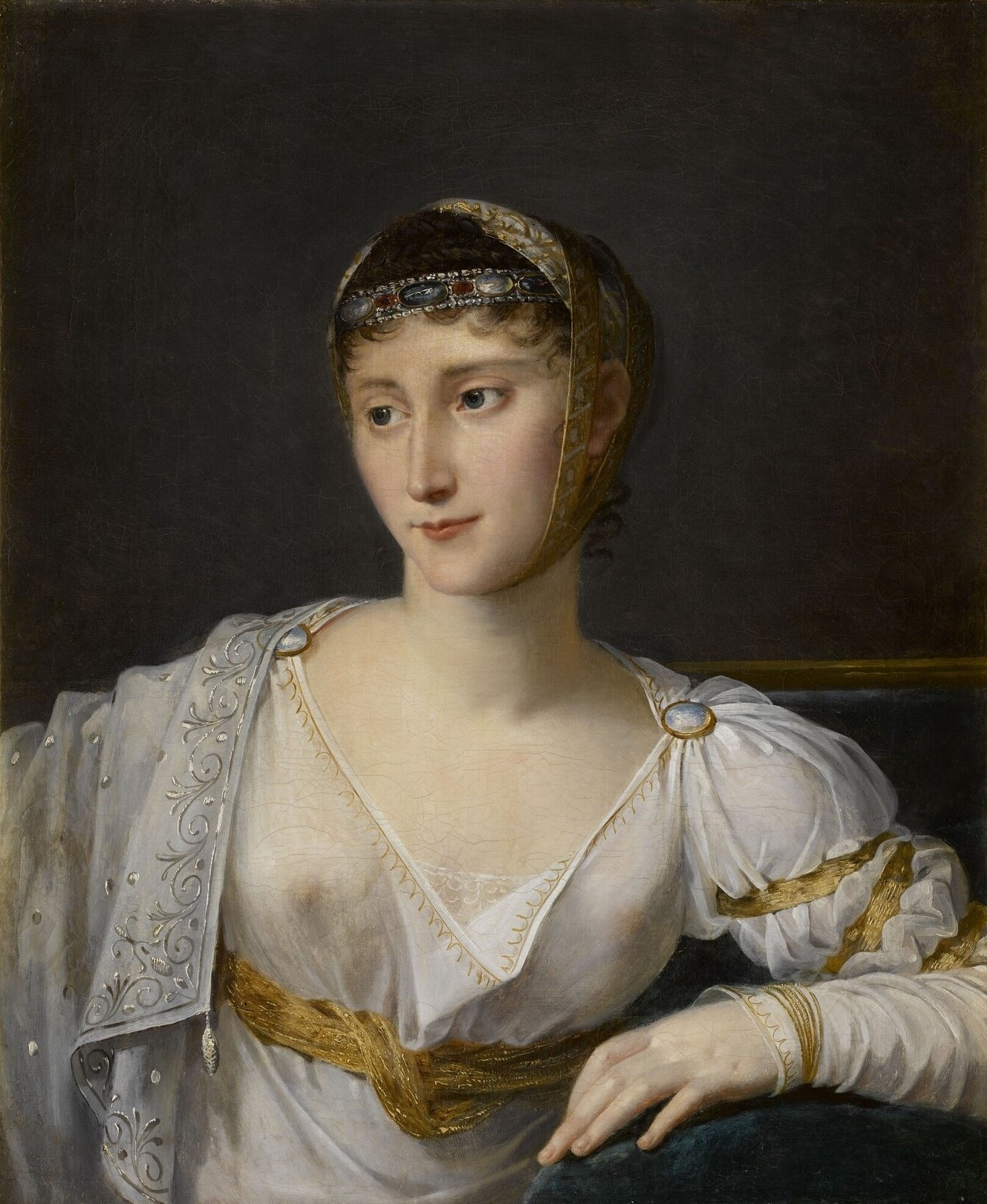
Portrait of Pauline Bonaparte by Robert Lefèvre

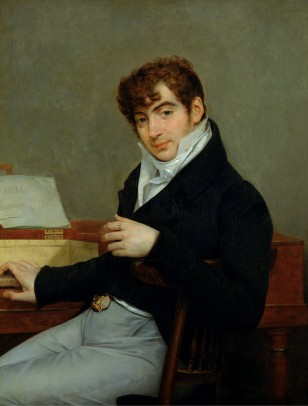
Portrait of Pierre Zimmerman by Antoine-Jean Gros

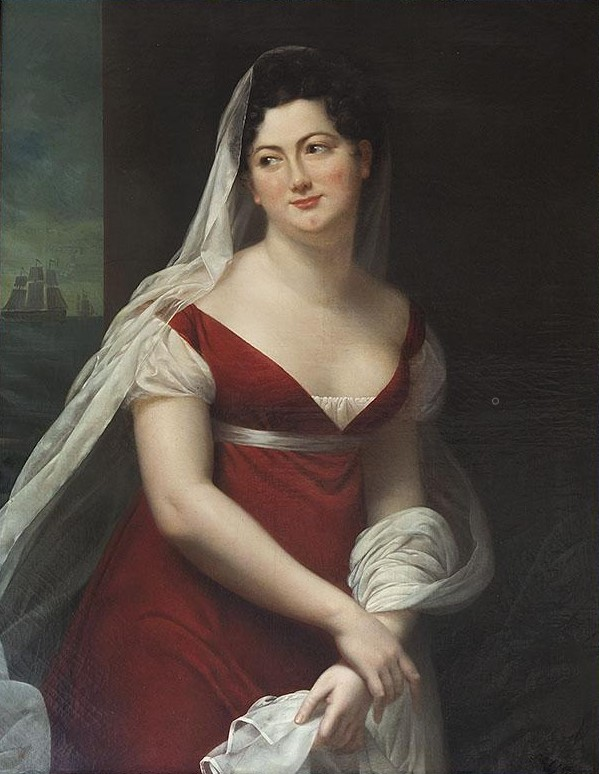
Jeanne-Émilie Leverd as Roxelane by Adèle Romany

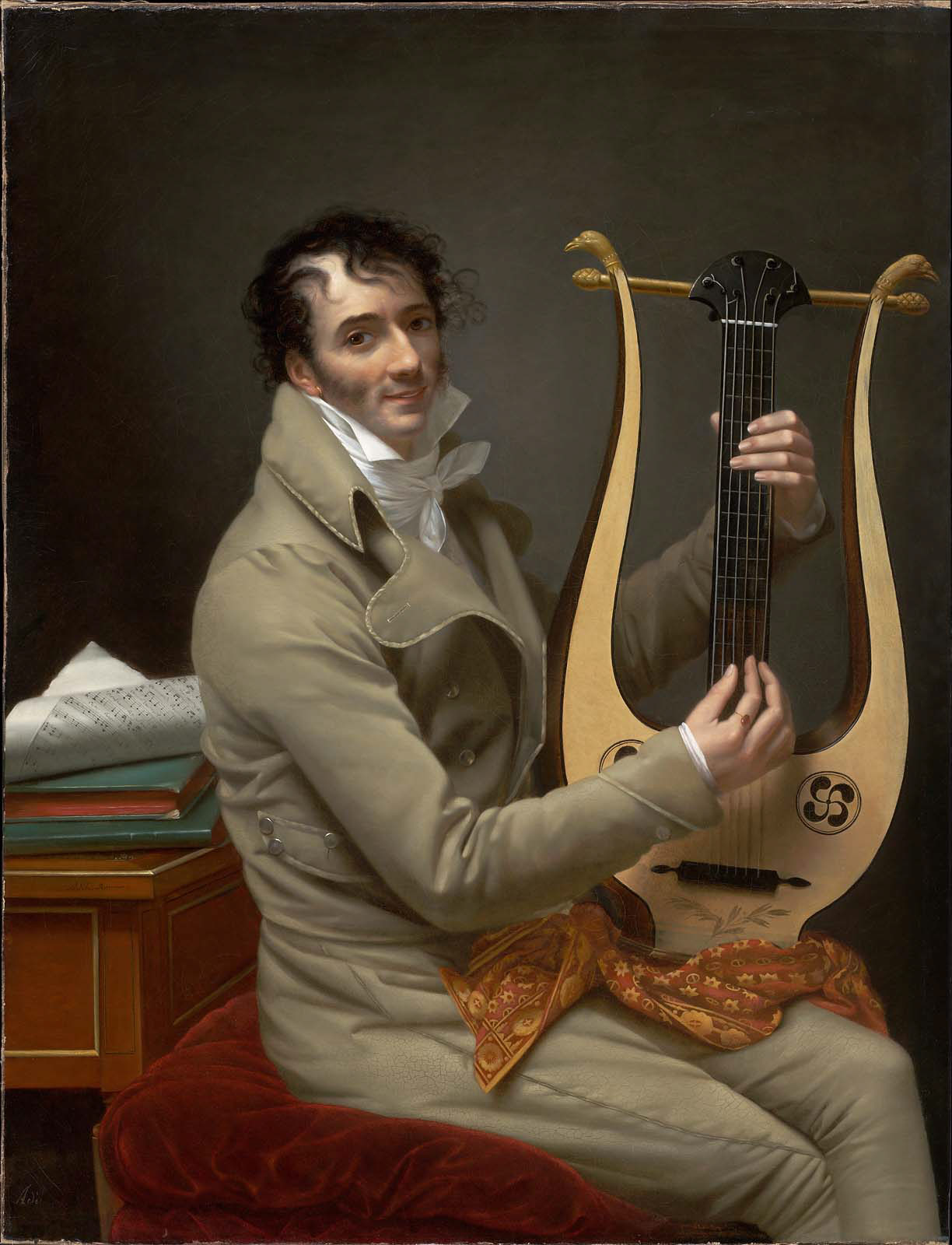
Portrait of Joseph Dominique Fabry-Garat by Adèle Romany

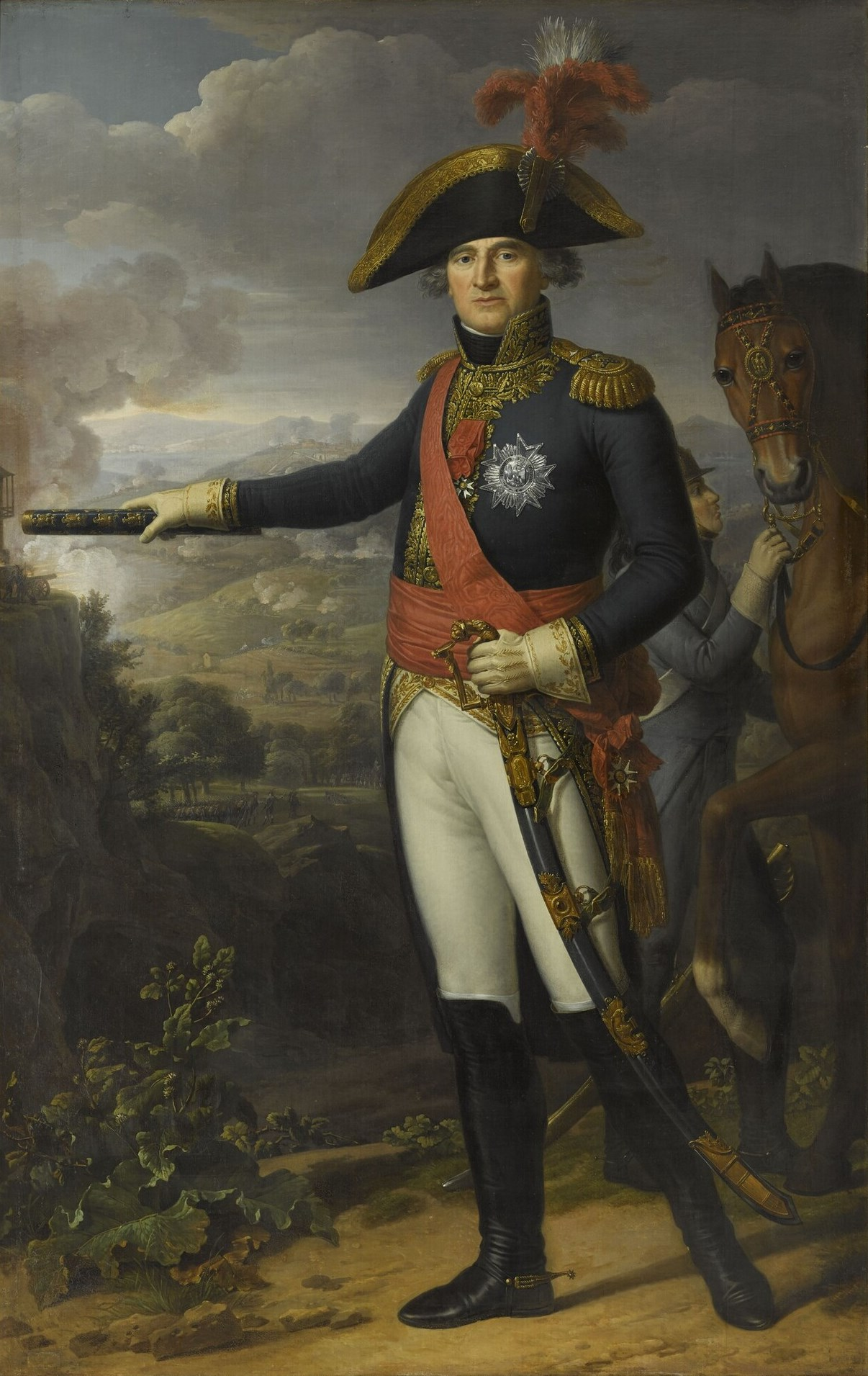
Portrait of Jean-Mathieu-Philibert Sérurier by Jean-Louis Laneuville

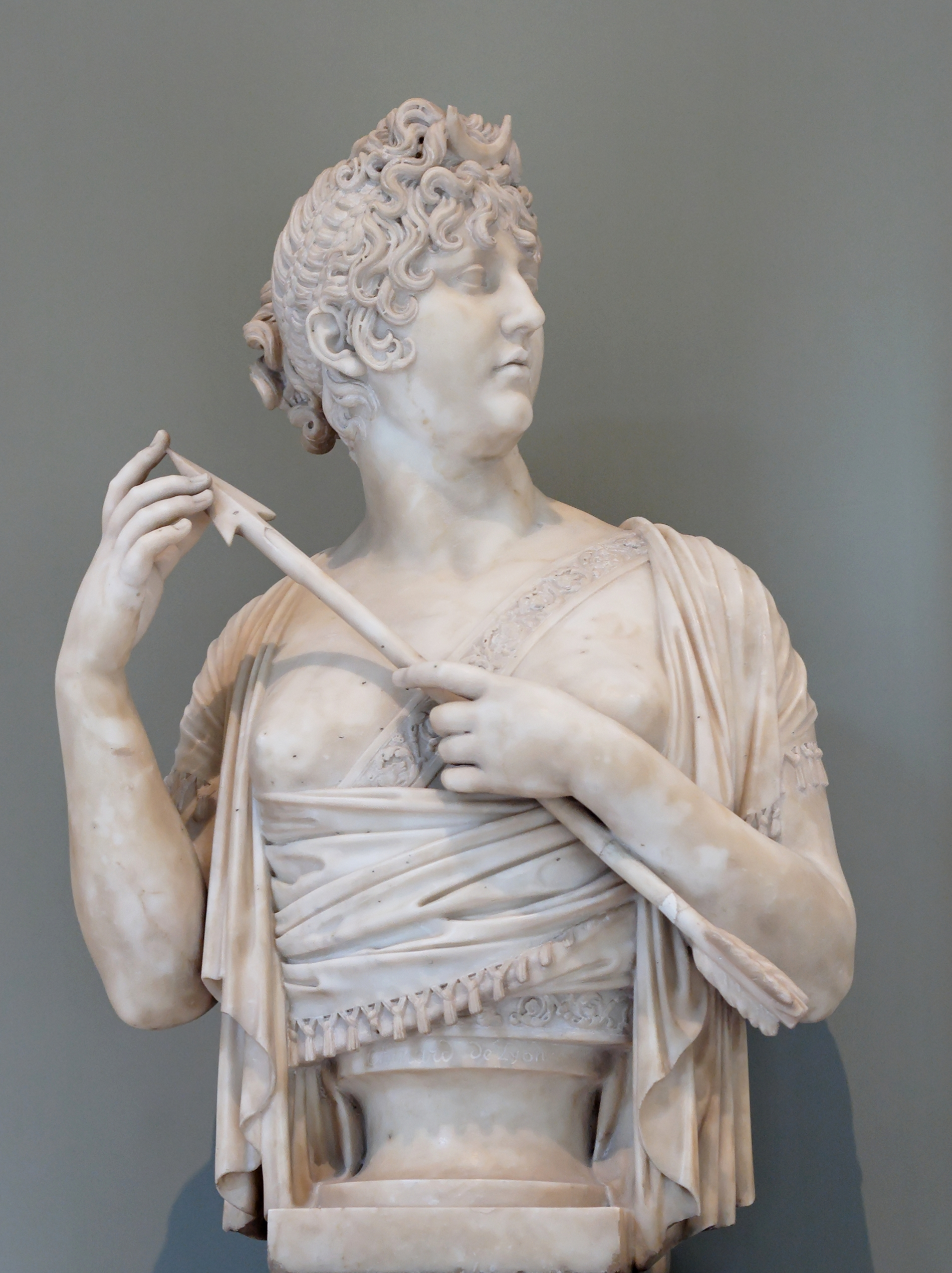
Henriette de Verninac as Diana the Huntress by Joseph Chinard

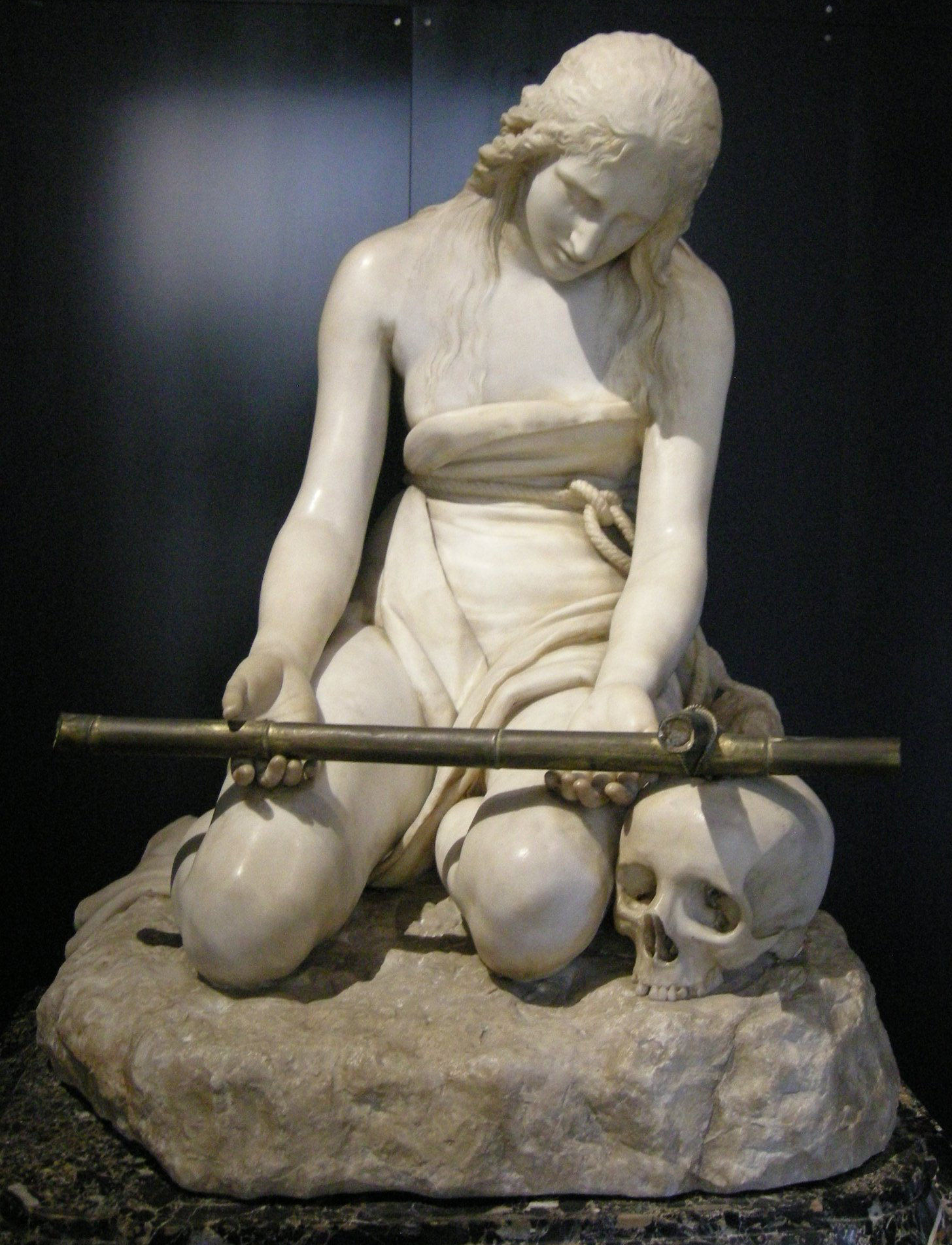
Penitent Magdalene by Antonio Canova

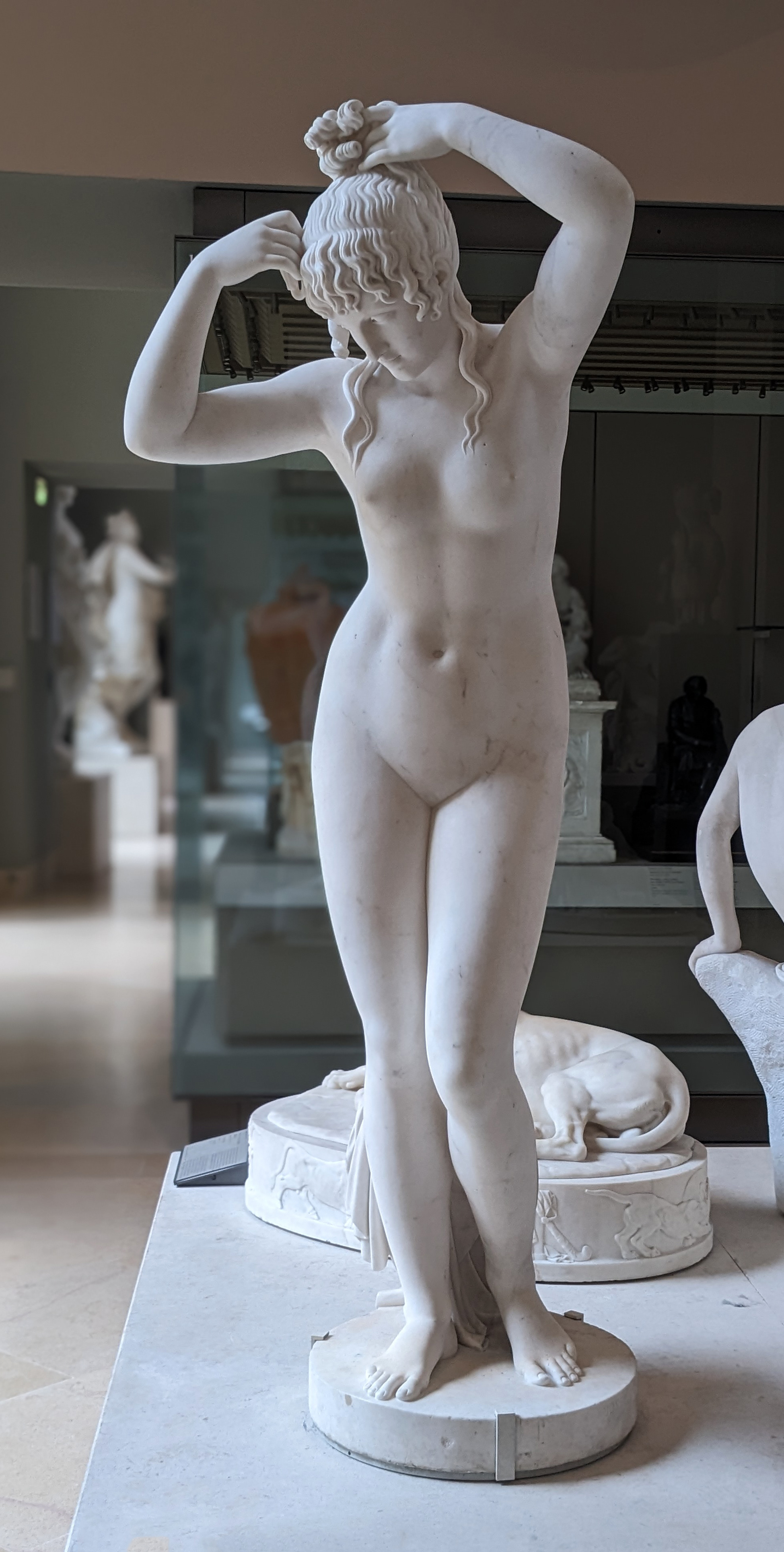
Baigneuse by Joseph-Charles Marin

== See also ==
- Royal Academy Exhibition of 1808 held at Somerset House in London

== Bibliography ==
- Baetjer, Katharine. French Paintings in The Metropolitan Museum of Art from the Early Eighteenth Century through the Revolution. Metropolitan Museum of Art, 2019.
- Johnson, Dorothy (ed.) Jacques-Louis David: New Perspectives. University of Delaware Press, 2006.
- Thoma, Julia. The Final Spectacle: Military Painting Under the Second Empire, 1855-1867. De Gruyter, 2019.
