= The Reading of the Bulletin of the Grande Armée =

Painting by Louis-Léopold Boilly

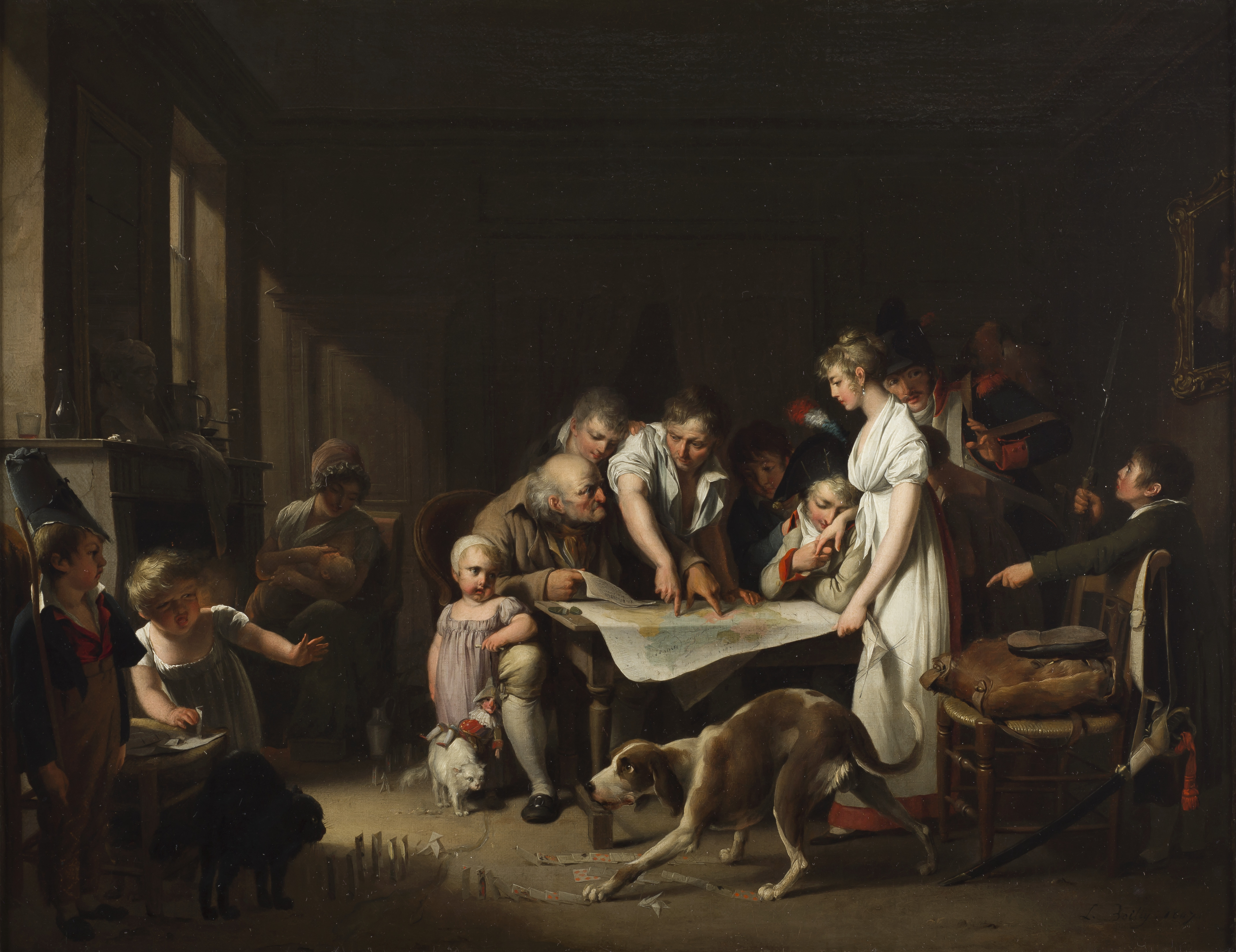
- Artist: Louis-Léopold Boilly
- Year: 1807
- Type: Oil on canvas, genre painting
- Dimensions: 44 cm × 59 cm (17 in × 23 in)
- Location: Saint Louis Art Museum, Missouri

The Reading of the Bulletin of the Grande Armée is an 1807 genre painting by the French artist Louis-Léopold Boilly. It depicts a family studying one of the Napoleonic bulletins issued by the French Emperor Napoleon. Posted during Napoleon's victorious War of the Fourth Coalition against Kingdom of Prussia, the family are following the progress of the campaign on a map.

It was exhibited at the Salon of 1808 at the Louvre in Paris. Today the painting is in the collection of the Saint Louis Art Museum in Missouri, having been acquired in 1904.

== Bibliography ==
- Allen, James Smith. In the Public Eye: A History of Reading in Modern France, 1800-1940. Princeton University Press, 2014.
- Hornstein, Katie. Picturing War in France, 1792–1856. Yale University Press, 2018.
