= The Sorrows of Love (painting) =

Painting by Louis-Léopold Boilly

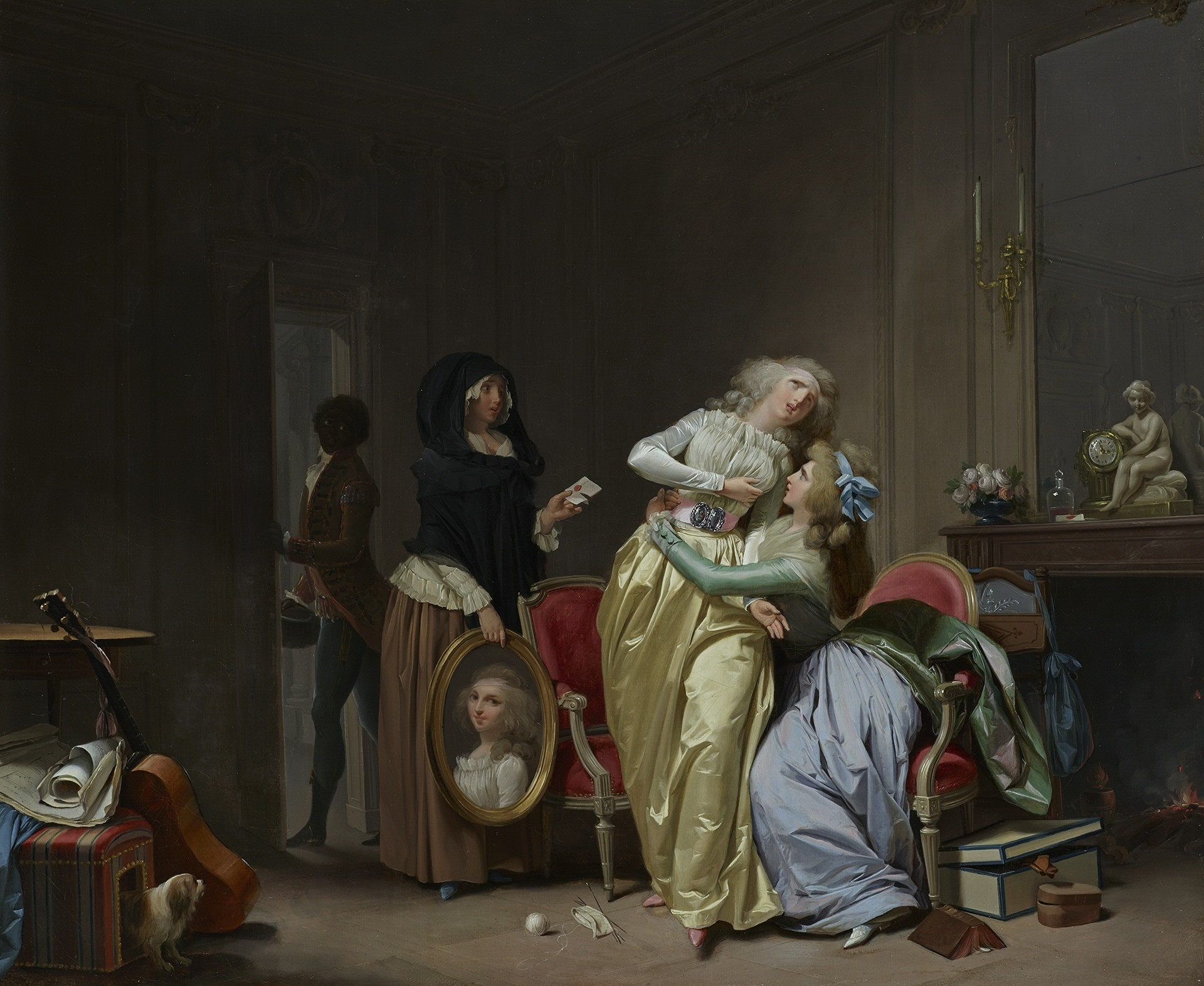
- Artist: Louis-Léopold Boilly
- Year: 1790
- Type: Oil on canvas, genre painting
- Dimensions: 45 cm × 55 cm (18 in × 22 in)
- Location: Wallace Collection, London

The Sorrows of Love (French: Les Malheurs de l'amour) is a 1790 genre painting by the French artist Louis-Léopold Boilly. In the early stages of his career Boilly largely produced genre paintings and portraits before switching to the street scenes of Paris for which he is best known.

It was one of eleven works Boilly produced for an aristocrat from Avignon Antoine Joseph François Xavier Calvet de Lapalun, all of which feature various stages of love. In this case a woman is left distraught when a servant of her former lover returns her portrait, signalling that their relationship is over.

Today the painting is in the Wallace Collection in London, having been acquired by Marquess of Hertford in 1863. Another painting in the series The Visit Returned is also in the Wallace Collection.

== Bibliography ==
- Bailey, Colin B. The Age of Watteau, Chardin, and Fragonard: Masterpieces of French Genre Painting. Yale University Press, 2003.
- Goodman, Dena. Becoming a Woman in the Age of Letters. Cornell University Press, 2009.
- MacDonald, Heather Eleanor (ed.) French Art of the Eighteenth Century. Yale University Press, 2016.
- Whitlum-Cooper, Francesca. Boilly: Scenes of Parisian Life. National Gallery Company, 2019.
