= Departure of the Conscripts =

Painting by Louis-Léopold Boilly

- Artist: Louis-Léopold Boilly
- Year: 1808
- Type: Oil on canvas, history painting
- Dimensions: 84.5 cm × 138 cm (33.3 in × 54 in)
- Location: Musée Carnavalet, Paris

Departure of the Conscripts (French: Les conscrits de 1807 défilant devant la porte Saint-Denis) is an 1808 history painting by the French artist Louis-Léopold Boilly. Set during the ongoing Napoleonic Wars, it depicts young men of the 1807 class of conscript being assembled in front of the Porte Saint-Denis monument in the city.

It was exhibited at the Salon of 1808 held at the Louvre. Today it is in the collection of the Musée Carnavalet in Paris.

== Bibliography ==
- Boime, Albert. A Social History of Modern Art, Volume 2: Art in an Age of Bonapartism, 1800-1815. University of Chicago Press, 1993.
- Eitner, Lorenz. French Paintings of the Nineteenth Century: Before impressionism. National Gallery of Art, 2000.
- Hosler, John D. Seven Myths of Military History. Hackett Publishing, 2022.
- Sérullaz, Arlette. French Painting: The Revolutionary Decades, 1760-1830. Australian Gallery Directors Council, 1980.
