= Louis-Léopold Boilly =

French painter and draftsman (1761–1845)

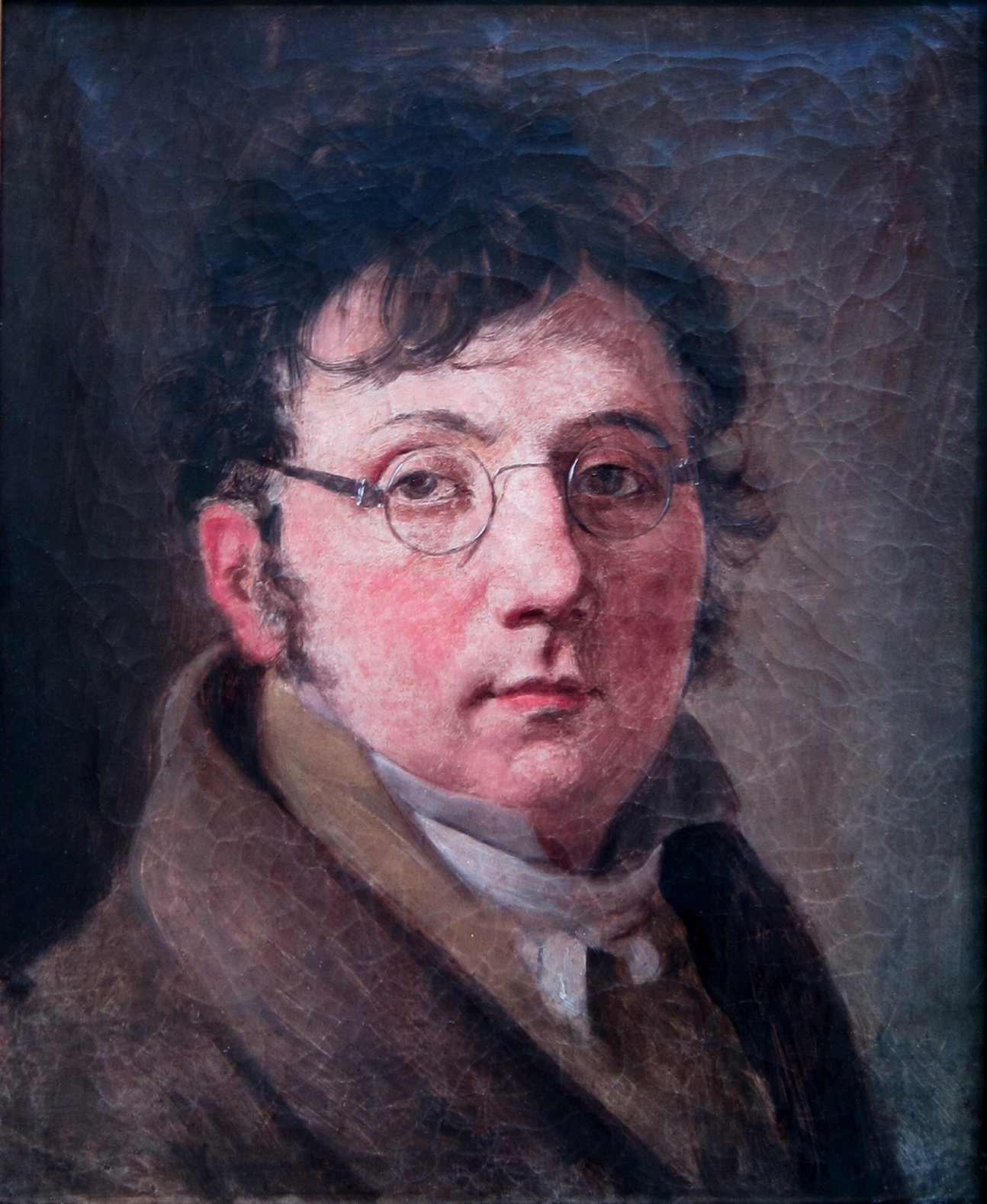
- Self-portrait, c. 1805
- Born: Louis-Léopold Boilly; 5 July 1761; La Bassée, France
- Died: 4 January 1845 (aged 83); Paris, France
- Known for: Portrait painting, genre painting

Louis-Léopold Boilly (French: [lwi leɔpɔl(d) bwɑji]; 5 July 1761 – 4 January 1845) was a French painter and draftsman. A creator of popular portrait paintings, he also produced a vast number of genre paintings documenting French middle-class social life. His life and work spanned the eras of monarchical France, the French Revolution, the Napoleonic Empire, the Bourbon Restoration and the July Monarchy. His 1800 painting Un Trompe-l'œil introduced the term trompe-l'œil ("trick the eye"), applied to the technique that uses realistic imagery to create the optical illusion that the depicted objects exist in three dimensions, though the "unnamed" technique itself had existed in Greek and Roman times.

== Life and career ==
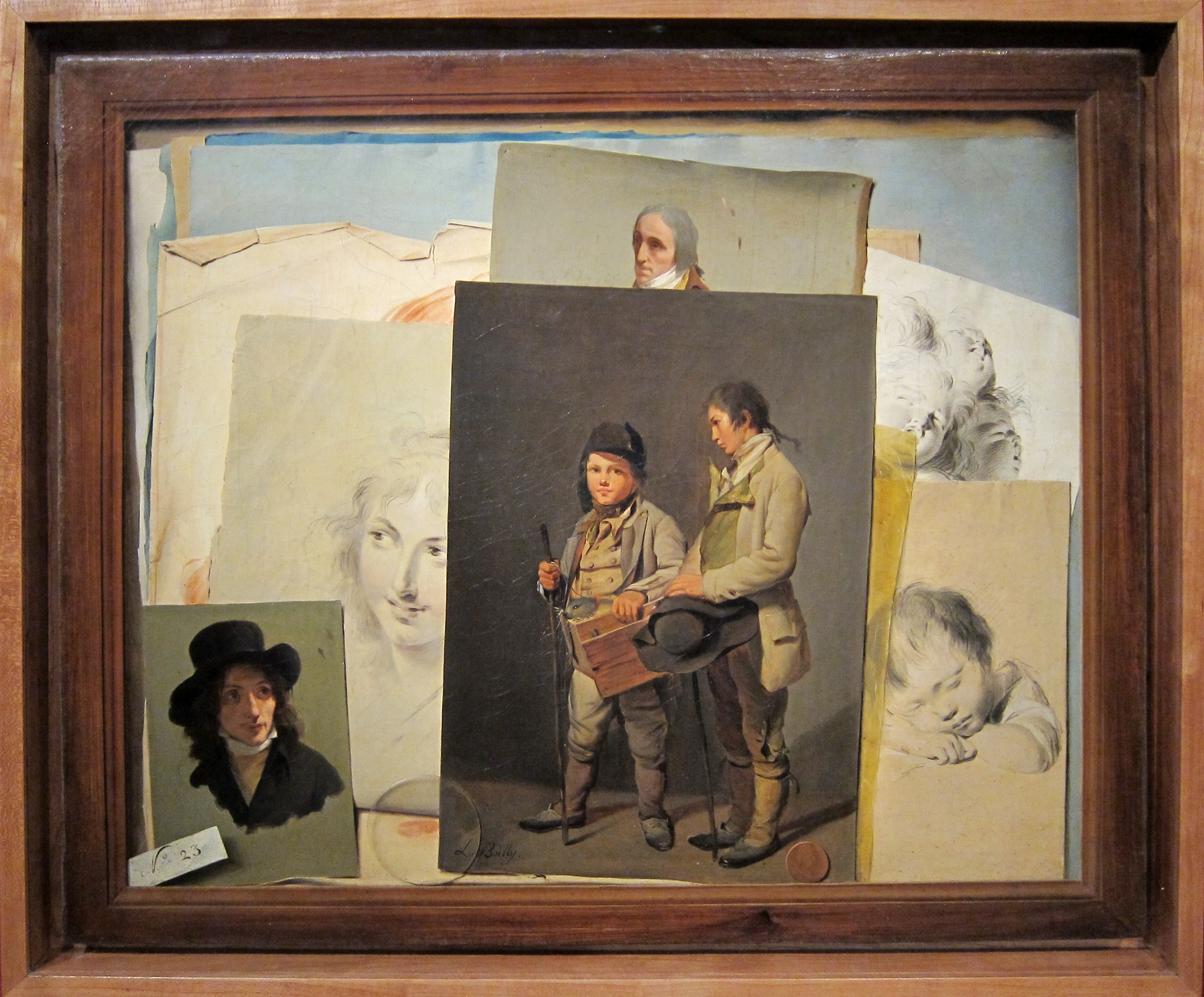
An early (between 1804 and 1807) trompe-l'œil piece by Boilly, similar to his etymological Un trompe-l'œil of 1800

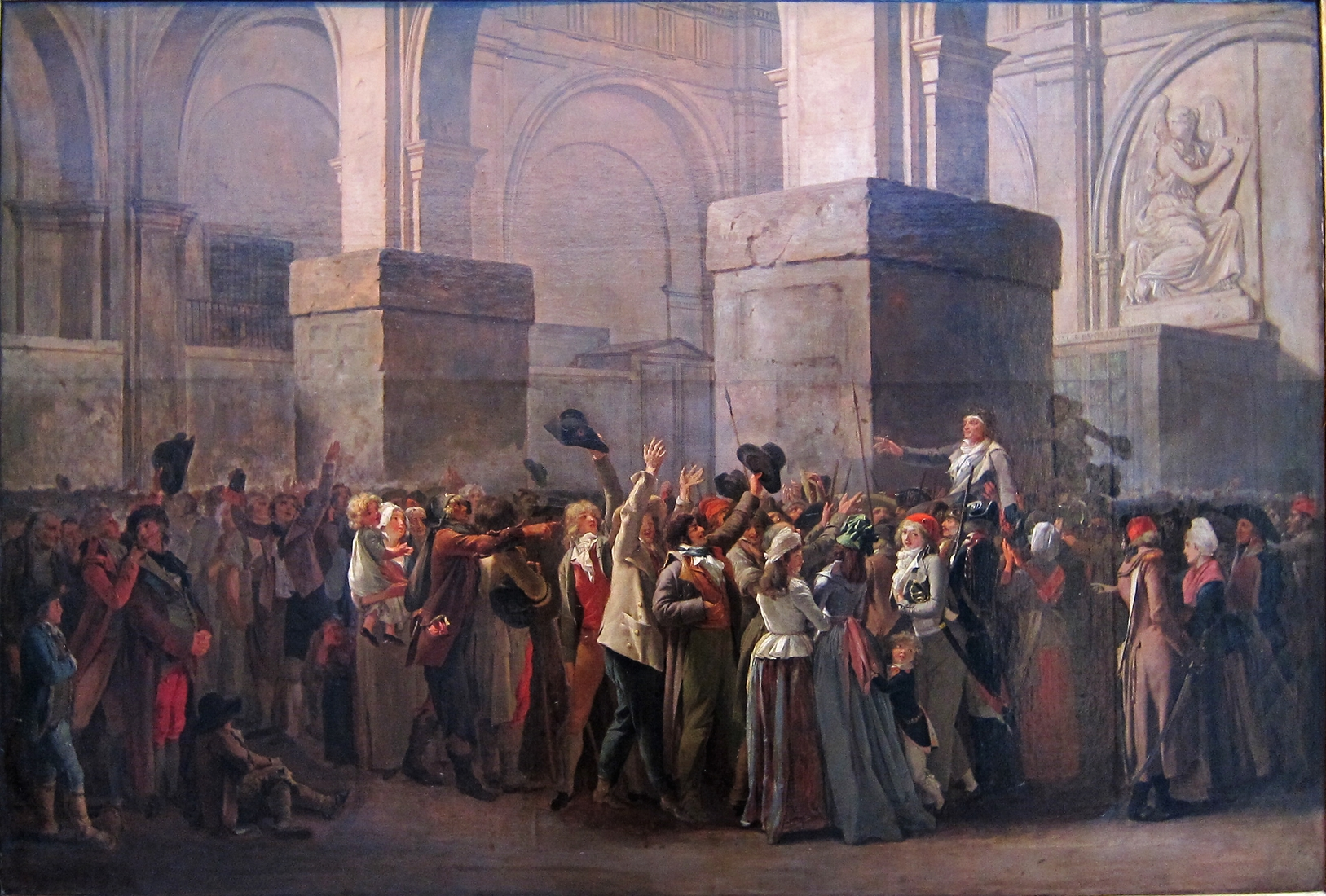
The Triumph of Marat, 1794

Boilly was born in La Bassée in northern France, the son of a local wood sculptor. A self-taught painter, Boilly began his career at a very young age, producing his first works at the age of twelve or thirteen. In 1774 he began to show his work to the Augustinians of Douai who were evidently impressed: within three years, the bishop of Arras invited him to work and study in his diocese. While there, he produced a cascade of paintings – some three hundred small works of portraiture. He received instruction in trompe-l'œil painting from Dominique Doncre (1743–1820) before moving to Paris around 1787.

At the height of the revolutionary Terror in 1794, Boilly was condemned by the Committee of Public Safety for the erotic undertones of his work. This offence was remedied by Boilly's eleventh-hour production of the more patriotic Triumph of Marat (now in the Musée des Beaux Arts, Lille) which saved him from serious penalties.

Boilly was a popular and celebrated painter of his time. He was among the first artists to produce lithographs, and became wealthy from the sale of his prints and paintings. He was awarded a medal by the Parisian Salon in 1804 for his work The Arrival of a Mail-coach in the Courtyard of the Messageries. In 1833 he was decorated as a chevalier of the nation's highest order, the Légion d'honneur.

Boilly died in Paris on 4 January 1845. His youngest son, Alphonse Boilly (1801–1867), was a professional engraver who apprenticed in New York with Asher Brown Durand.

== Style and works ==
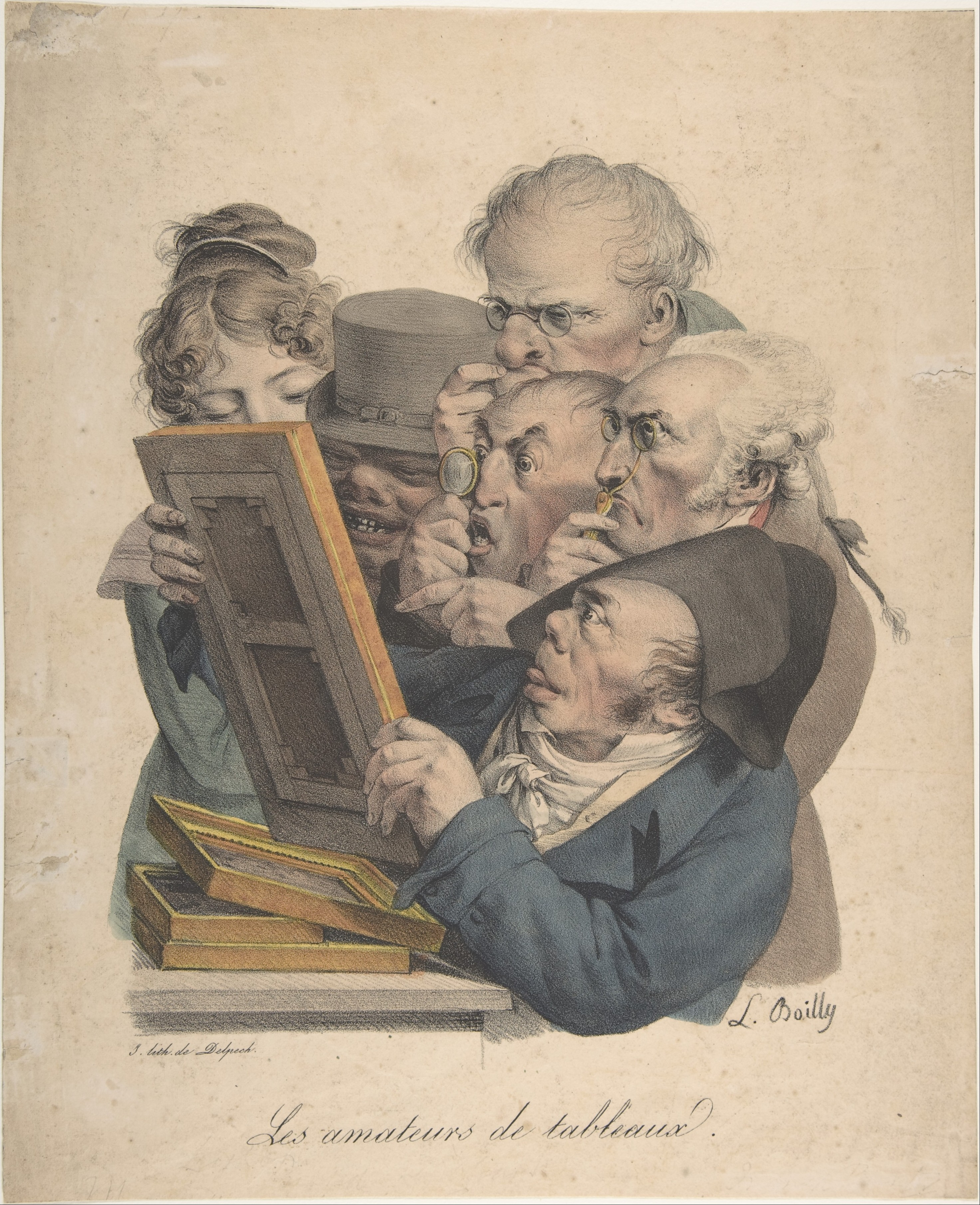
Fine art Connoisseurs, c. 1823–1828, lithograph with hand coloring

Boilly's early works showed a preference for amorous and moralising subjects. The Suitor's Gift is comparable to much of his work in the 1790s. His small-scale paintings with carefully mannered colouring and precise detailing recalled the work of seventeenth-century Dutch genre painters such as Gabriël Metsu (1629–1667), Willem van Mieris and Gerard ter Borch (1617–1681), of whose work Boilly owned an important collection.

After 1794, Boilly began to produce far more crowded compositions that serve as social chronicles of the urban middle class. In these works, his observation of contemporary customs is slightly sentimental and often humorous.

Boilly was also well respected for his portraiture. By the end of his lifetime he had painted about 5,000 portraits, most of which were painted on canvases measuring 22 cm x 17 cm (8 5/8 in. x 6 5/8 in.). He worked quickly, and boasted of requiring only two hours to complete a portrait. He painted both middle class sitters and prominent contemporaries such as Robespierre. Boilly's portraits strongly characterize the sitters as individuals, and are usually painted in a sober range of colors.

Boilly used his great skill in depicting textures to produce numerous illusionistic works, including paintings in grisaille that mimic prints. In the Salon of 1800 he exhibited a painting that depicted layers of overlapping prints, drawings, and papers, covered by a sheet of broken glass in a wooden frame. His title for the work, Un trompe-l'œil ("a trick played on the eye"), marked the first use of that term to describe an illusionistic painting. Although art critics derided the painting as a stunt, it caused a popular sensation, and trompe-l'œil entered the language as a name for an entire genre.

His interest in caricature is most apparent in his suite of 98 lithographs titled Recueil de grimaces, published between 1823 and 1828.

Boilly remains a highly regarded master of oil painting. A major exhibition of his work, The Art of Louis-Léopold Boilly: Modern Life in Napoleonic France, travelled to the United States where it was shown at both the Kimbell Art Museum in Fort Worth and the National Gallery of Art in Washington (1995). The Musée des Beaux Arts in Lille held a large-scale exhibition of Boilly's work during the winter season of 2011–2012.

== Gallery ==
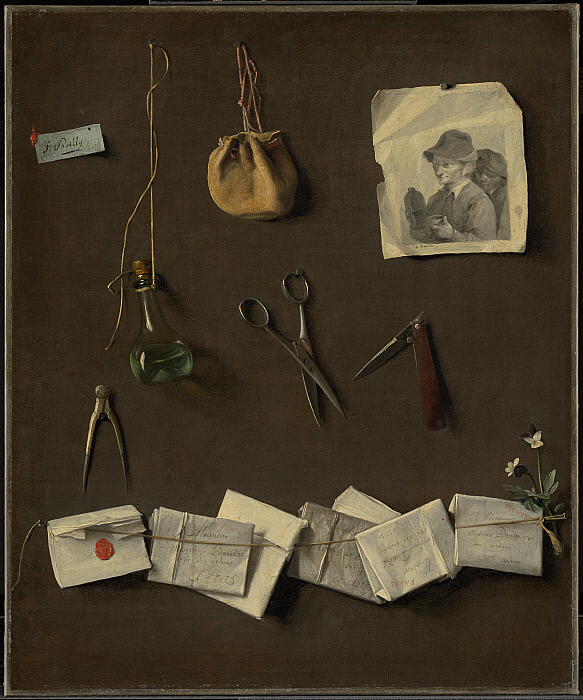
Various Objects (c.1785), Oil on canvas, 28 1/2 x 23 3/4 in. (72.4 x 60.3 cm), Clark Art Institute

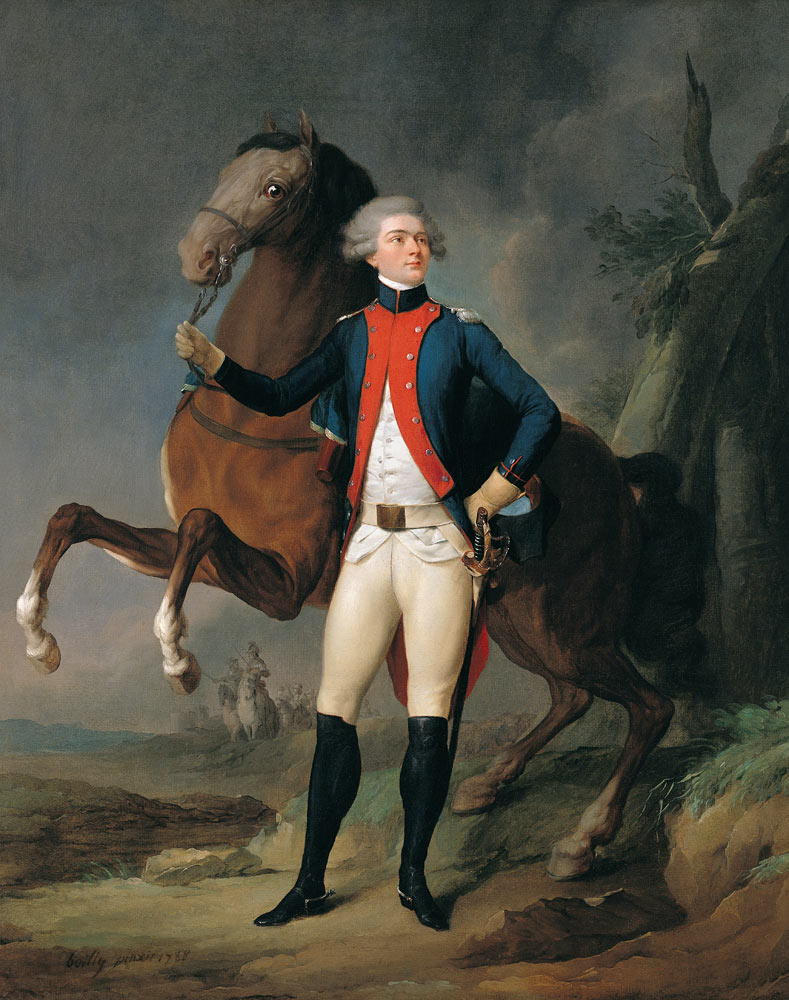
Portrait of the Marquis de Lafayette, 1788

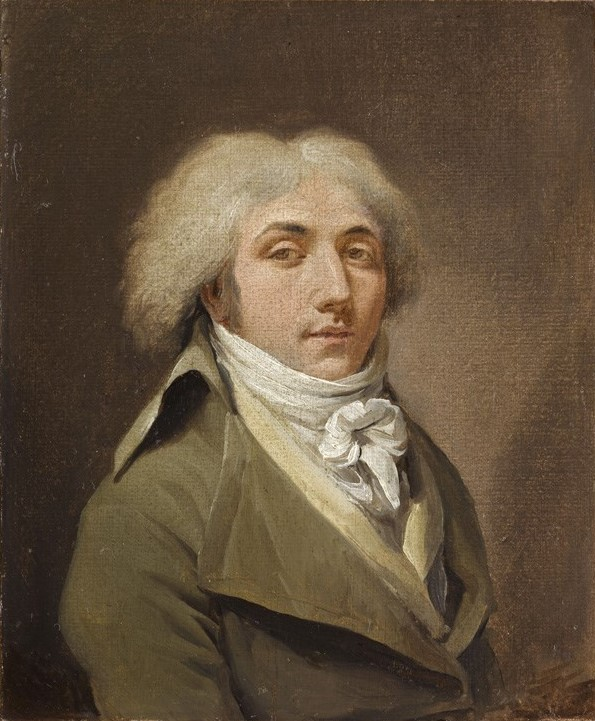
Self-portrait c. 1793

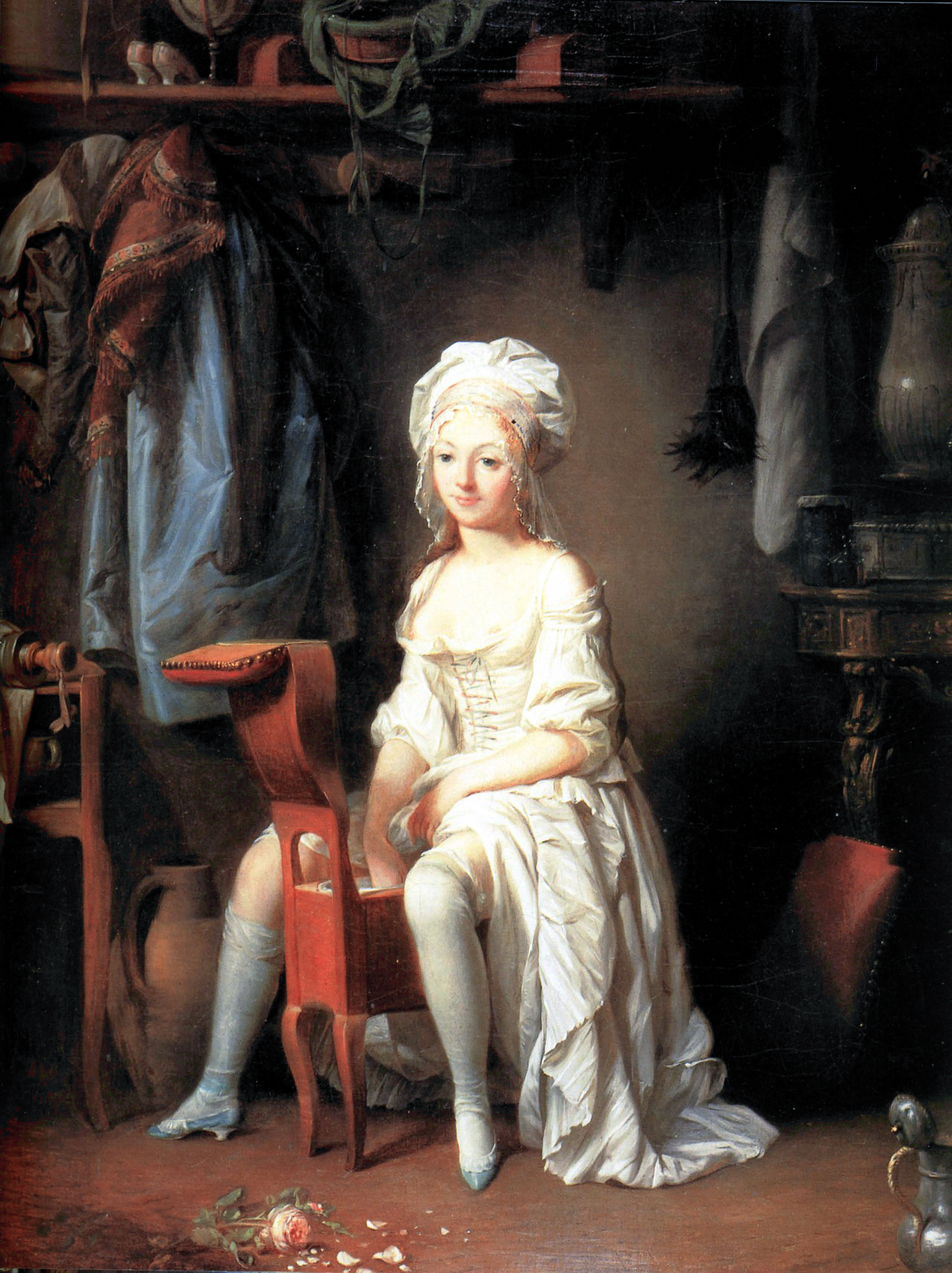
La Toilette intime

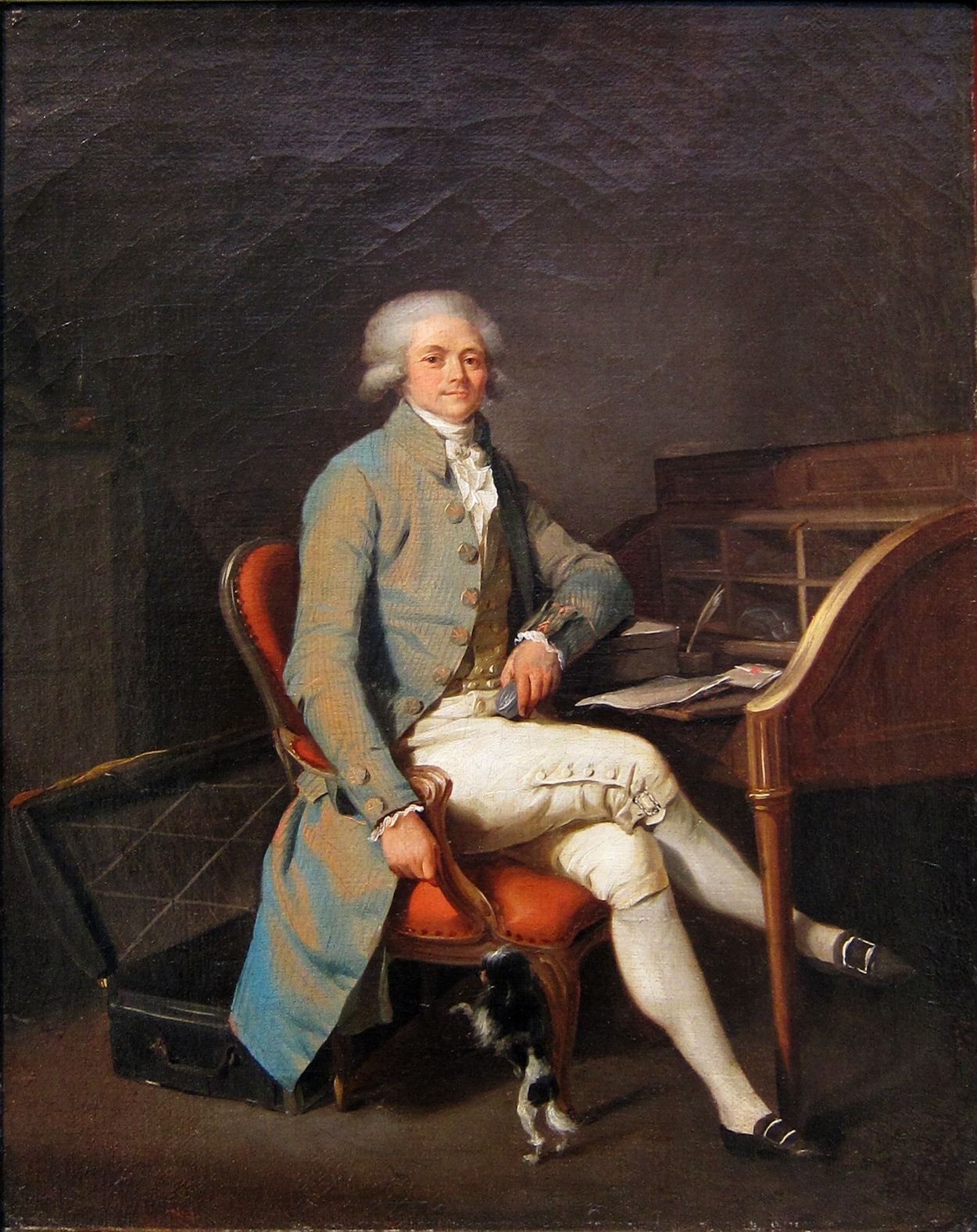
Portrait of Robespierre, 1791

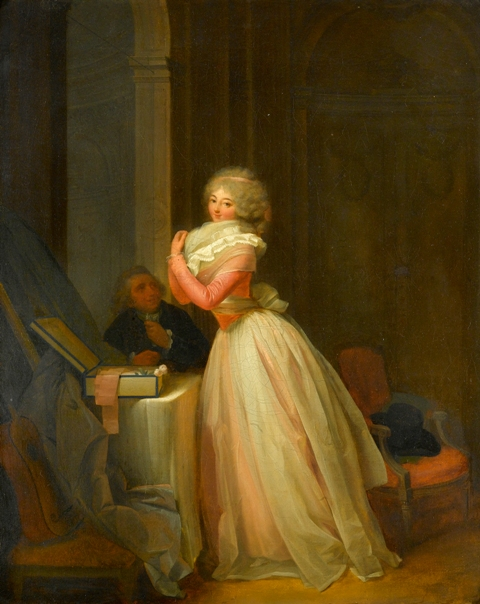
The Suitor's Gift, c. 1790, Royal Scottish Academy

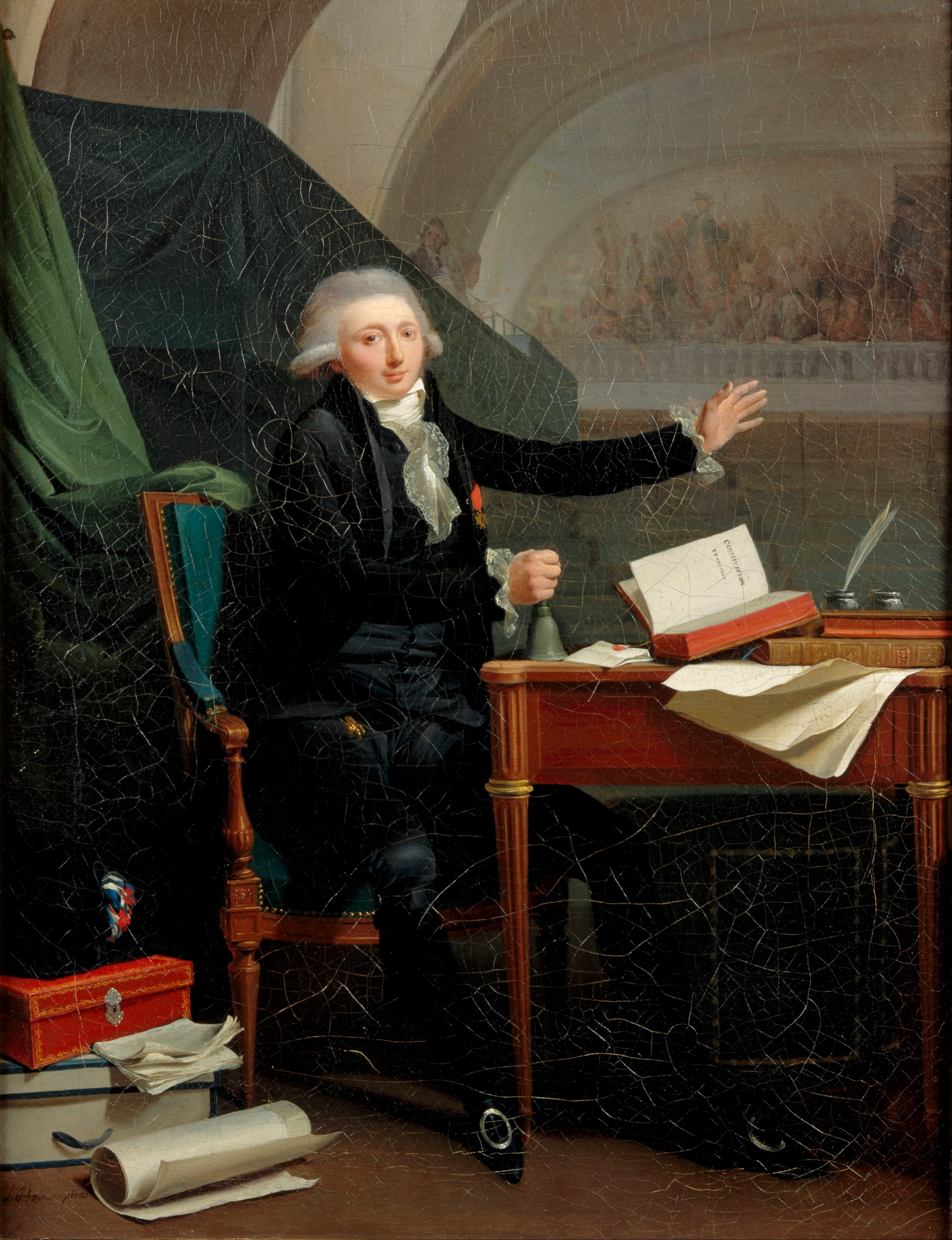
Portrait of Jan Anthony d'Averhoult, 1792, Centraal Museum

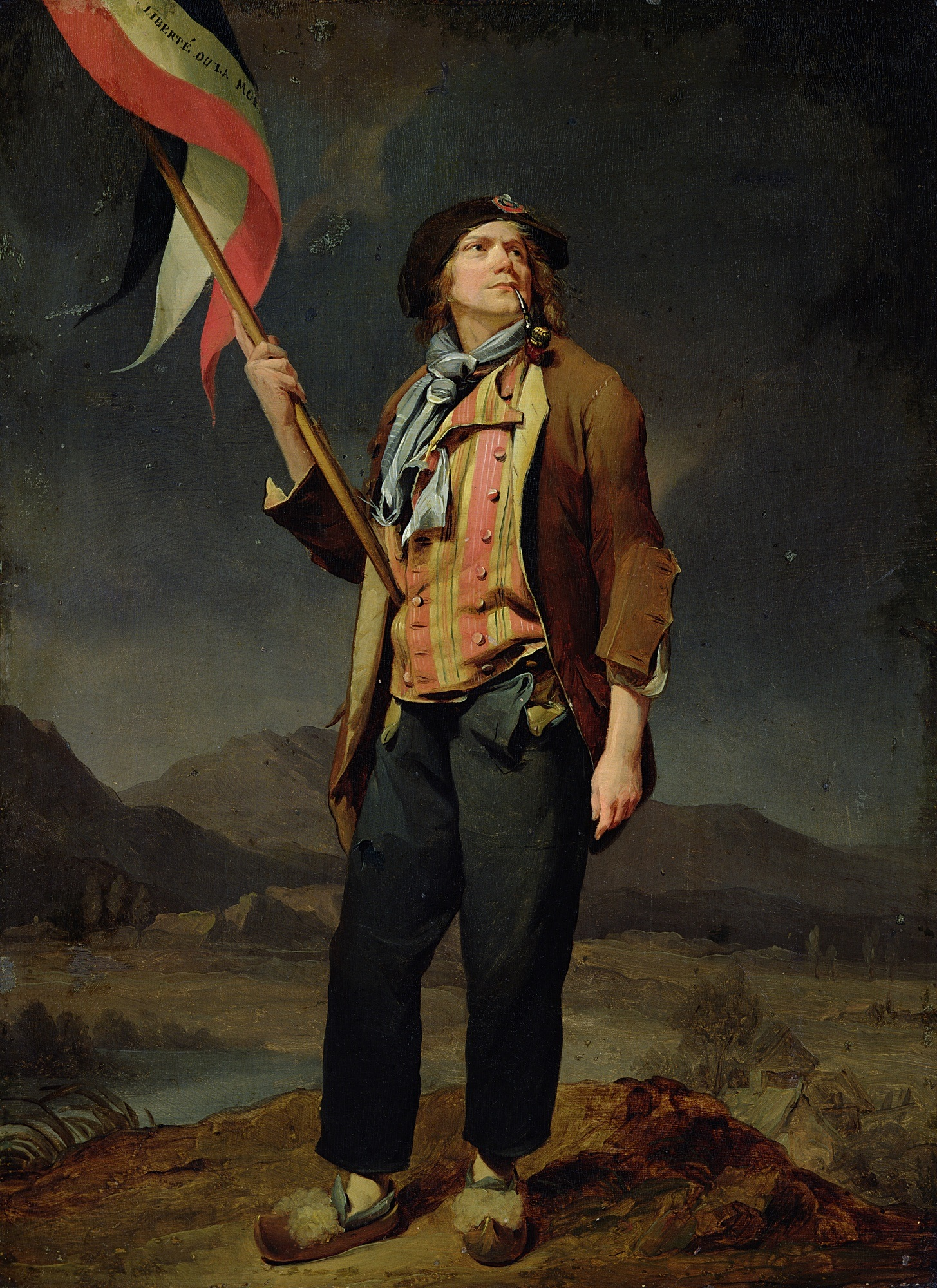
Simon Chenard as a Sans-Culotte, 1792

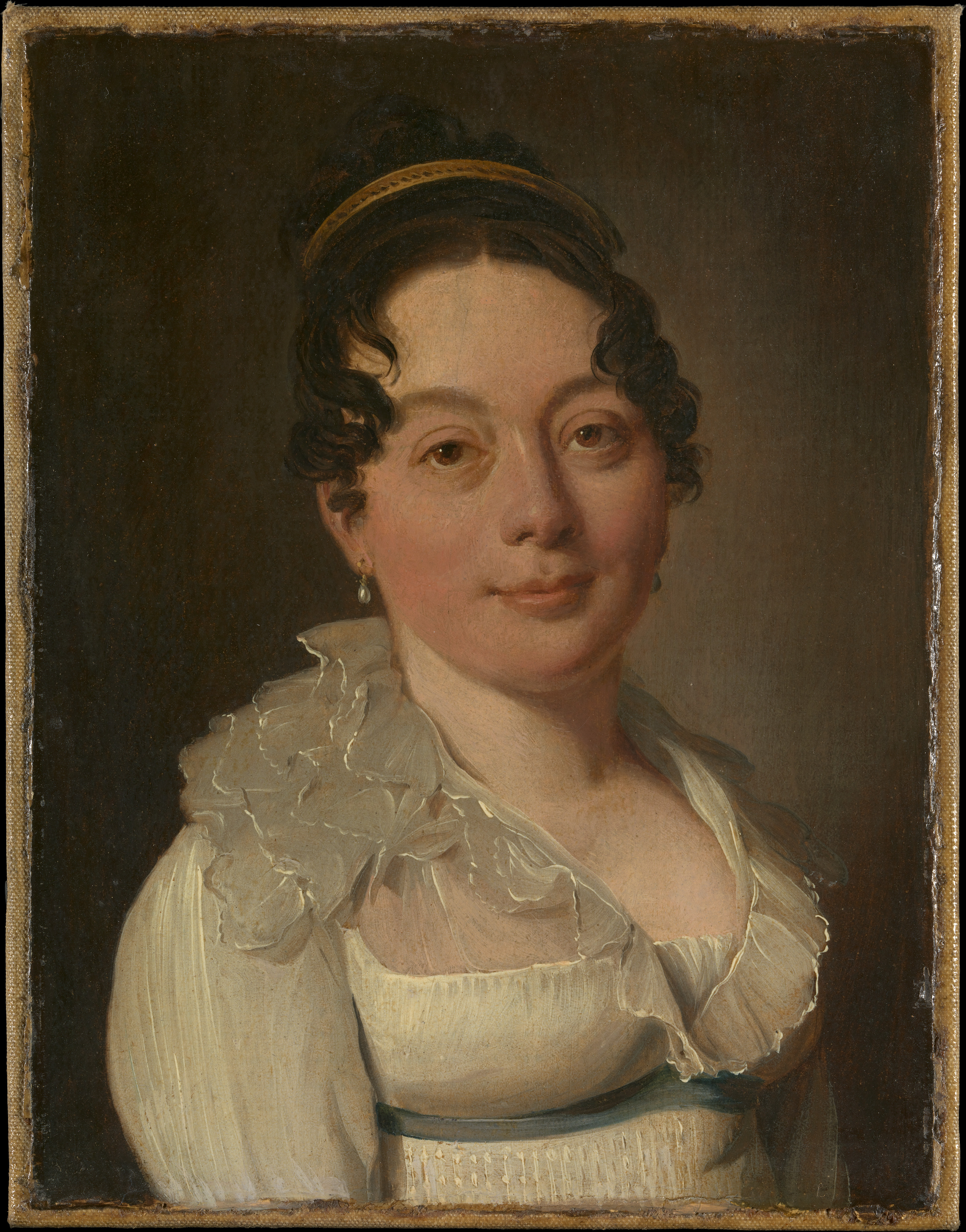
Portrait of a Woman, Metropolitan Museum of Art

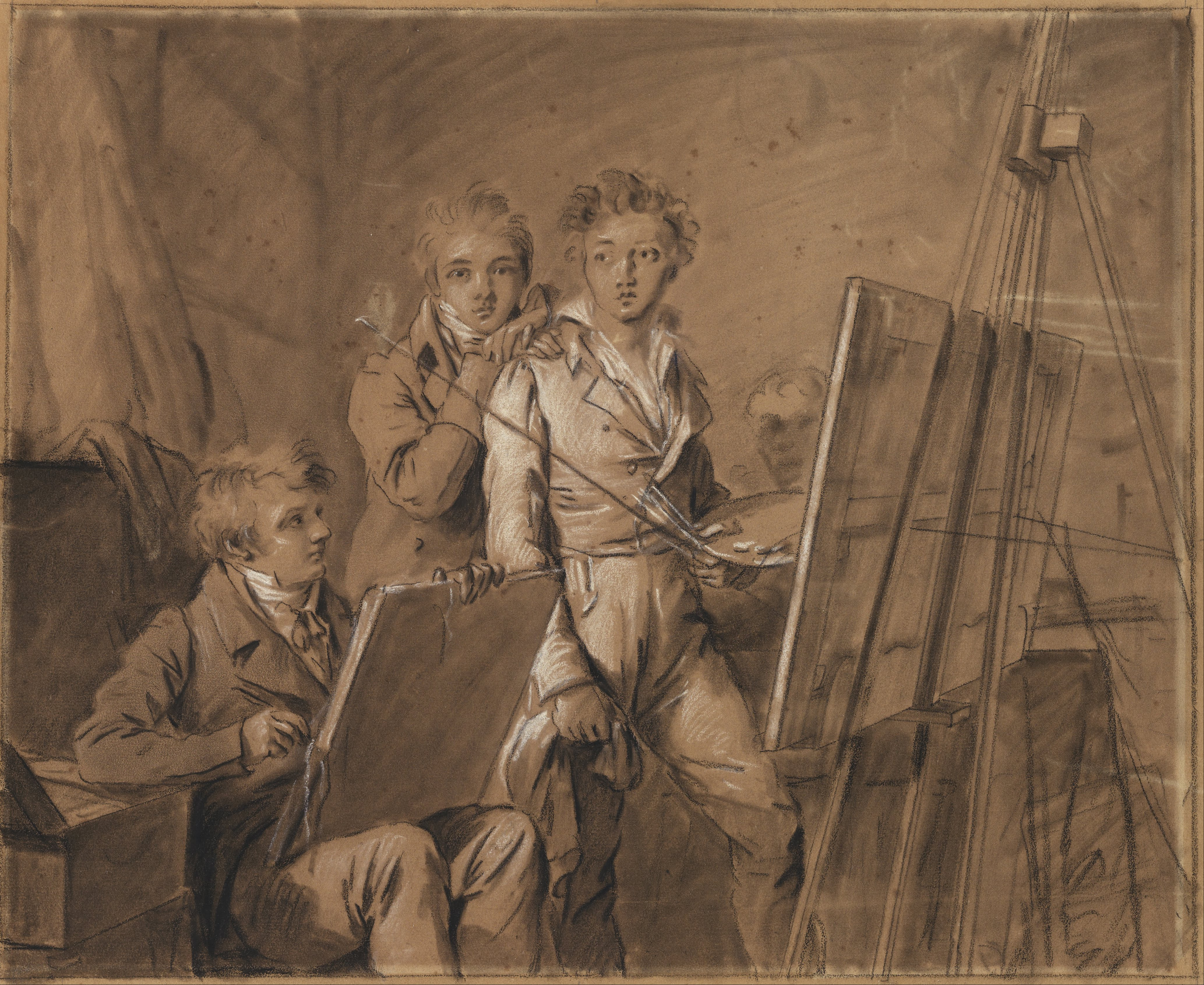
Three Young Artists in a Studio

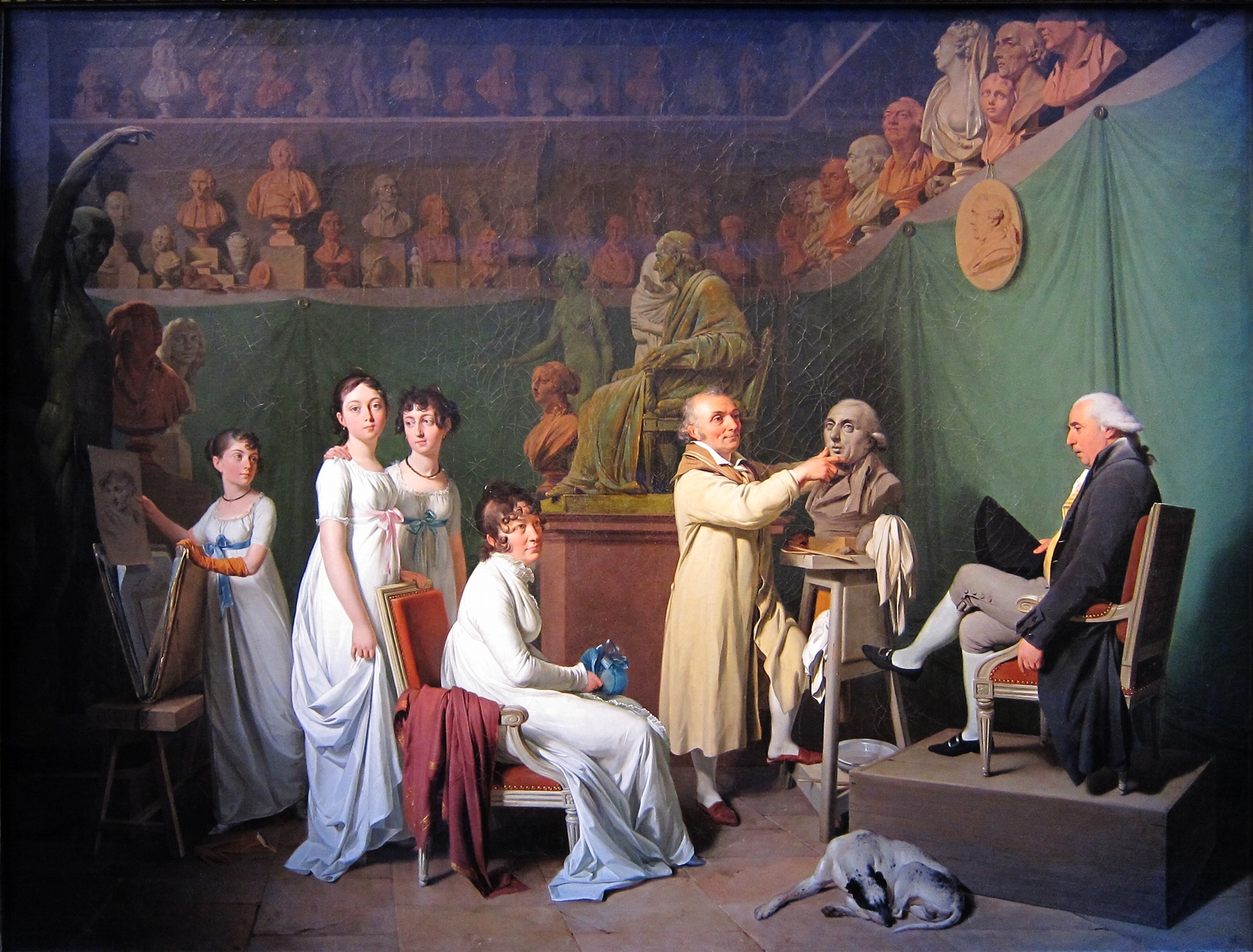
The Studio of Jean-Antoine Houdon, 1804

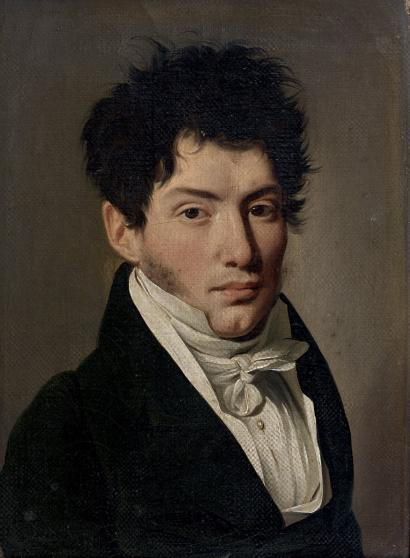
Portrait of Charles-Louis Havas

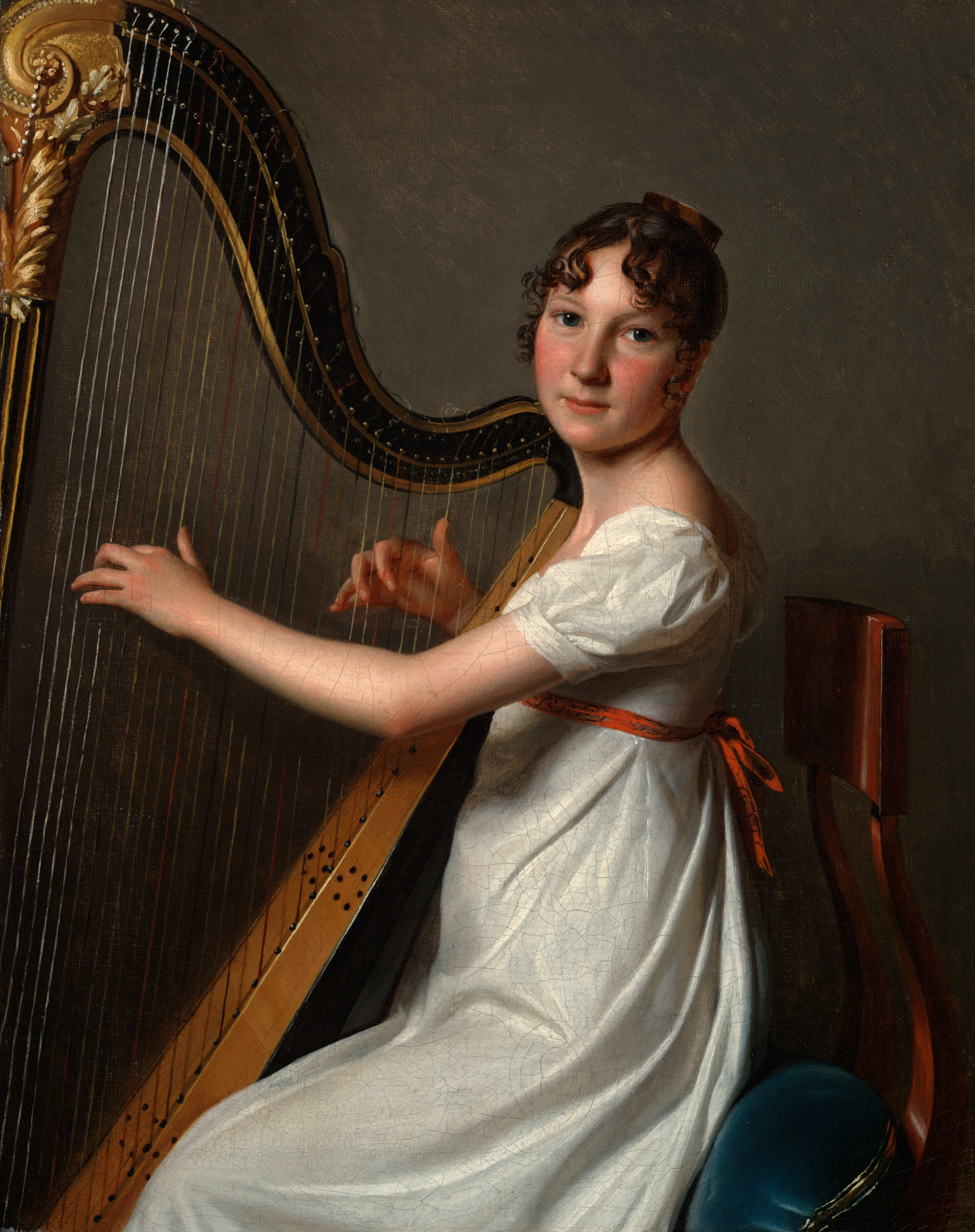
Young Harpist, c. 1804–1806

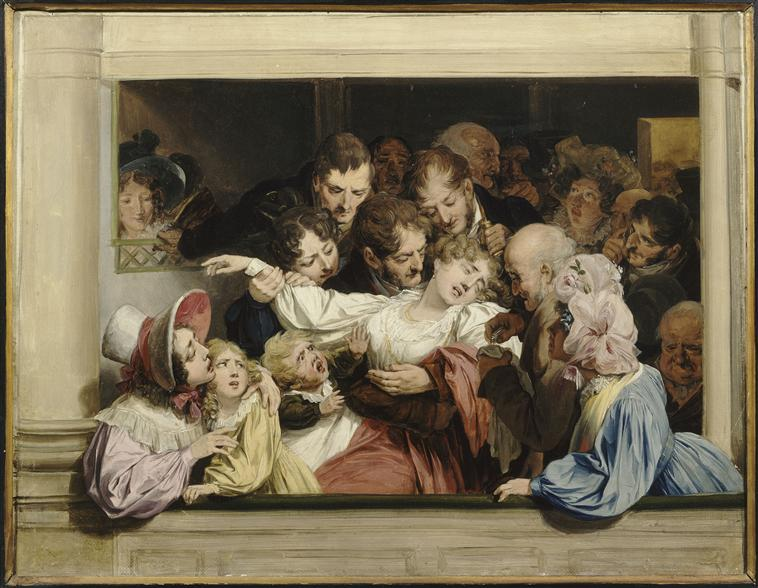
L'effet du mélodrame, 1830

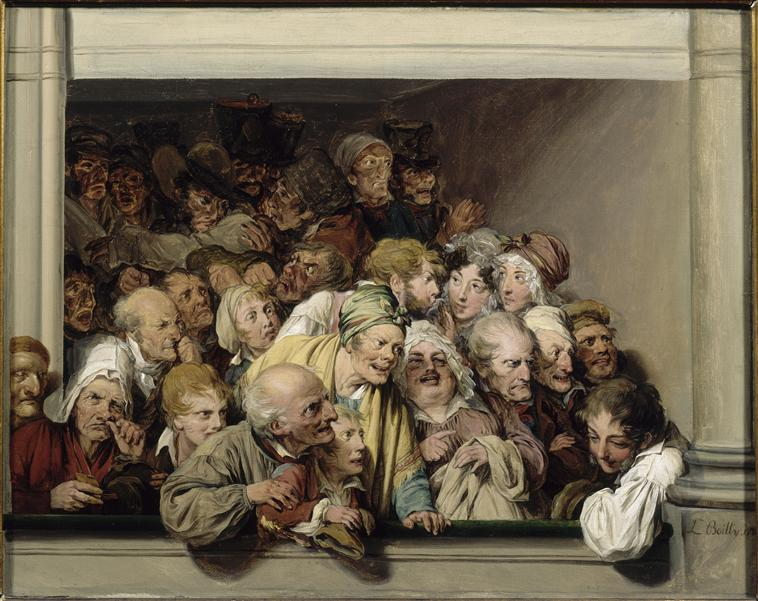
Une loge, 1830

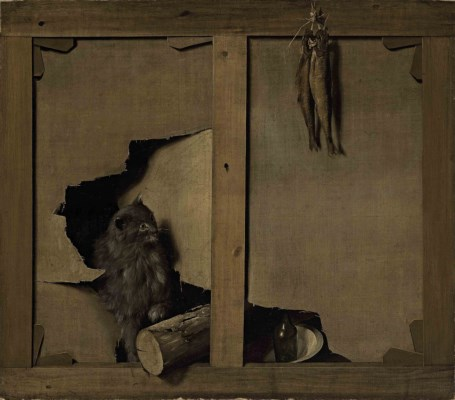
Trompe-l'œil with a cat and a wooden log through a canvas, fish hanging from the stretcher

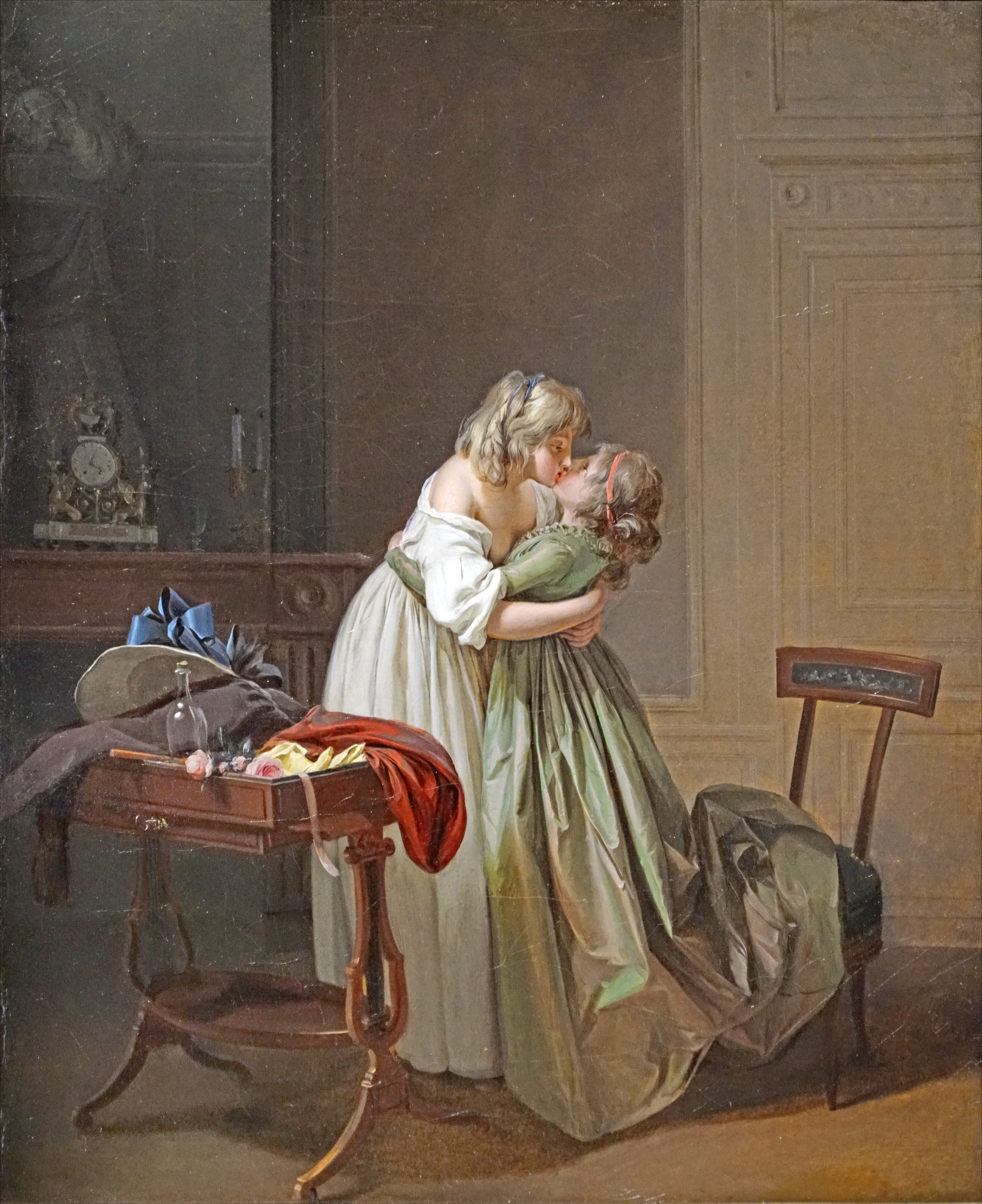
Two Young Women Kissing, 1789–1793

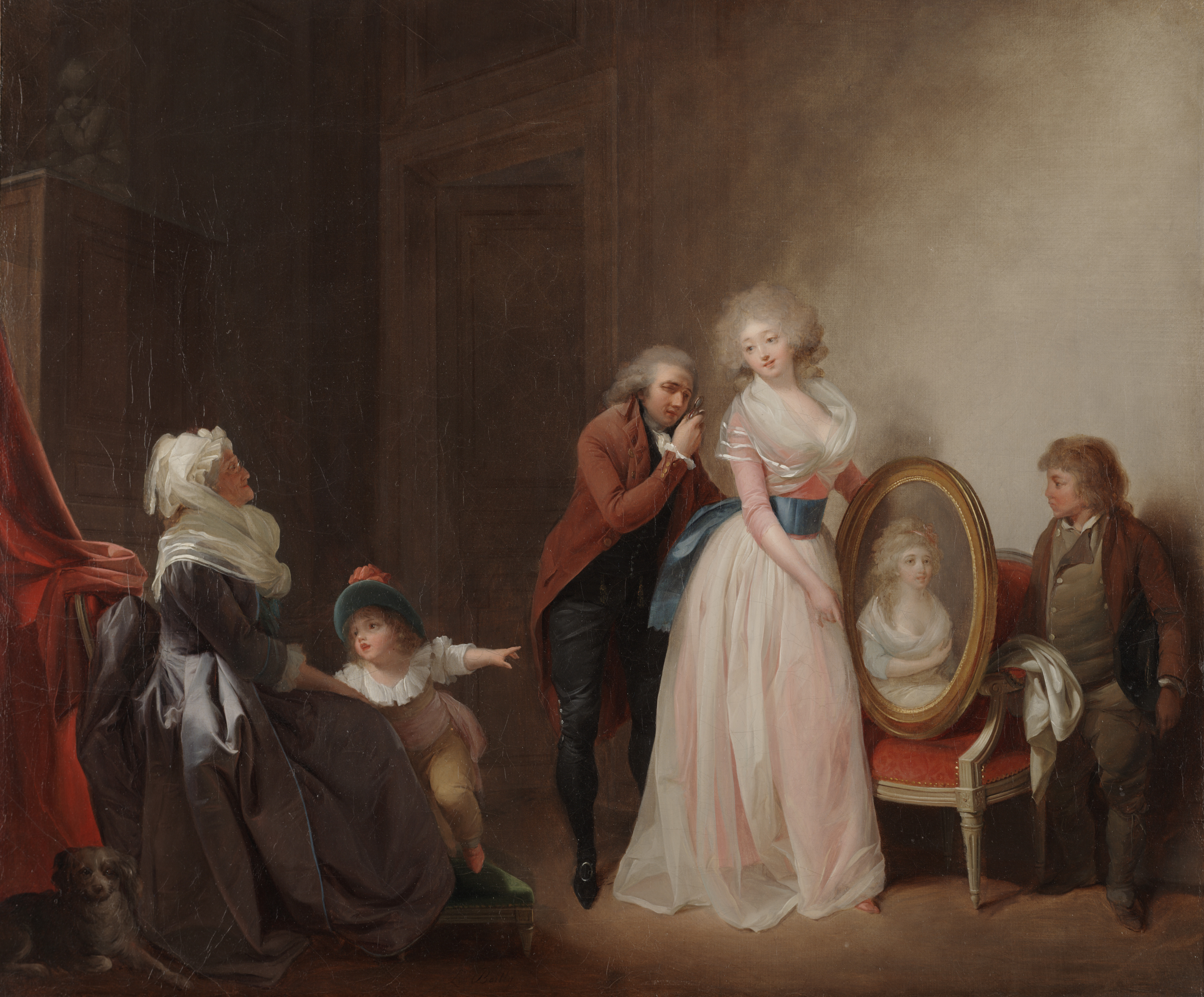
Woman Showing Her Portrait, 1790

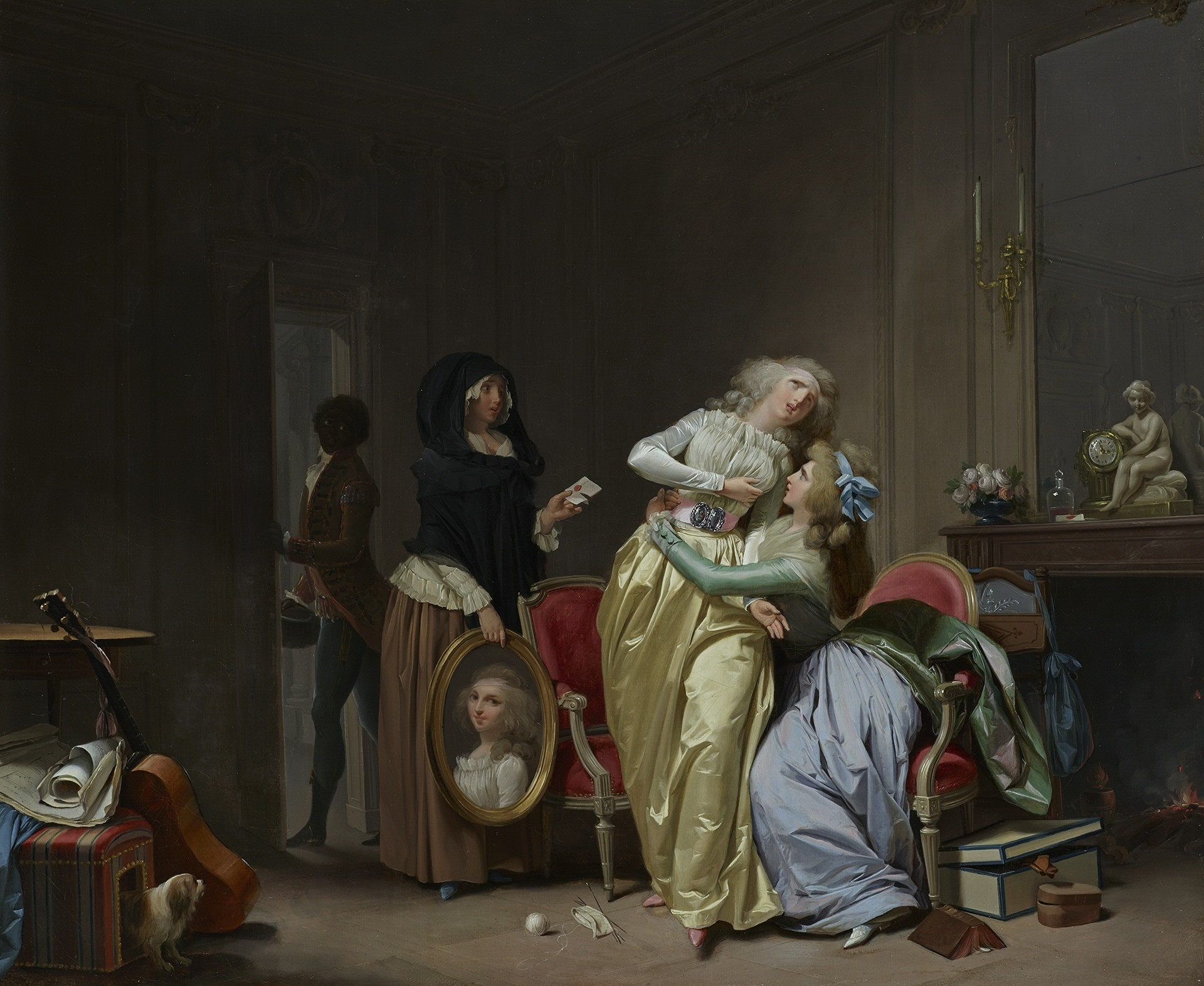
The Sorrows of Love, 1790

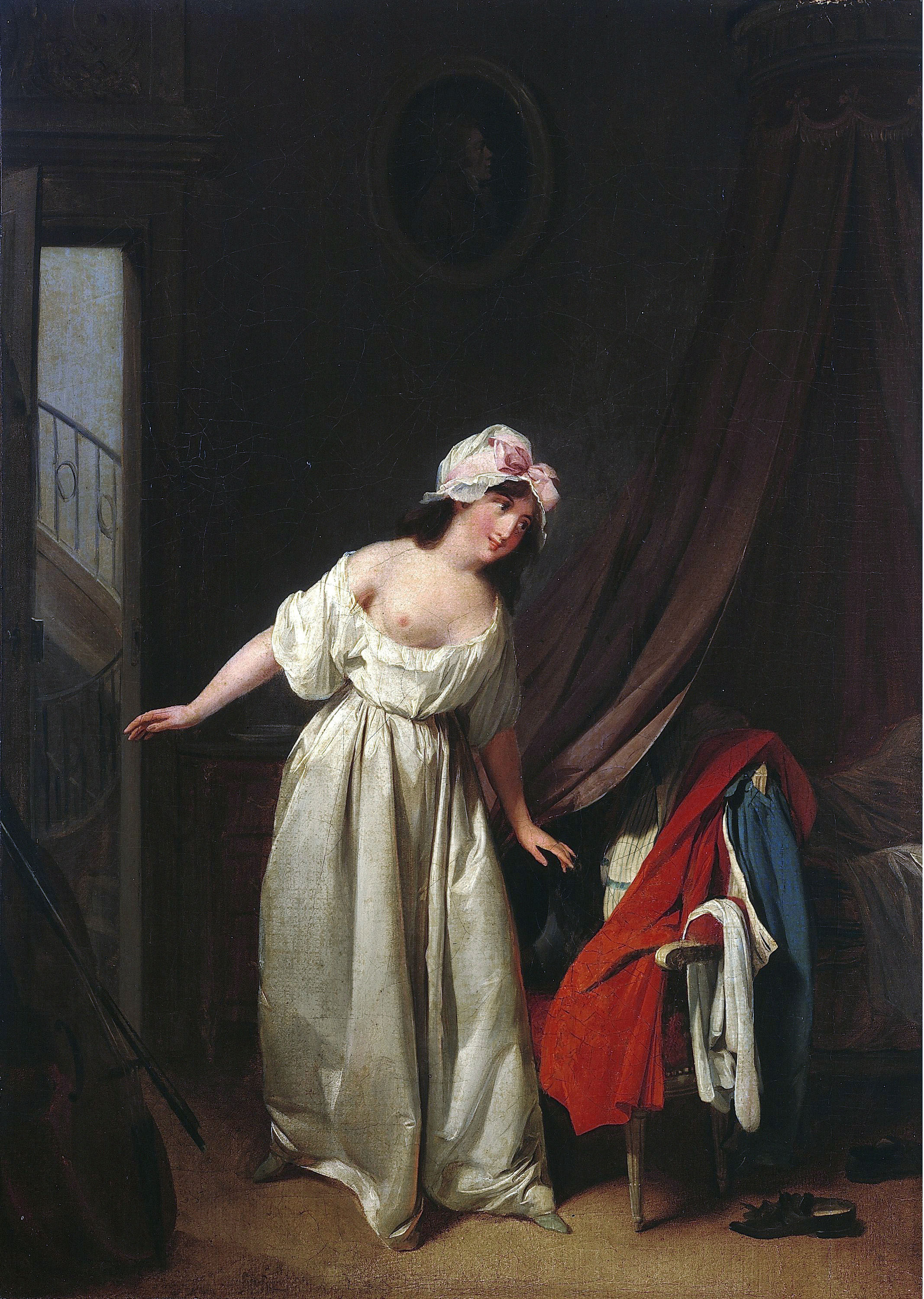
Le Doux Réveil, 1795

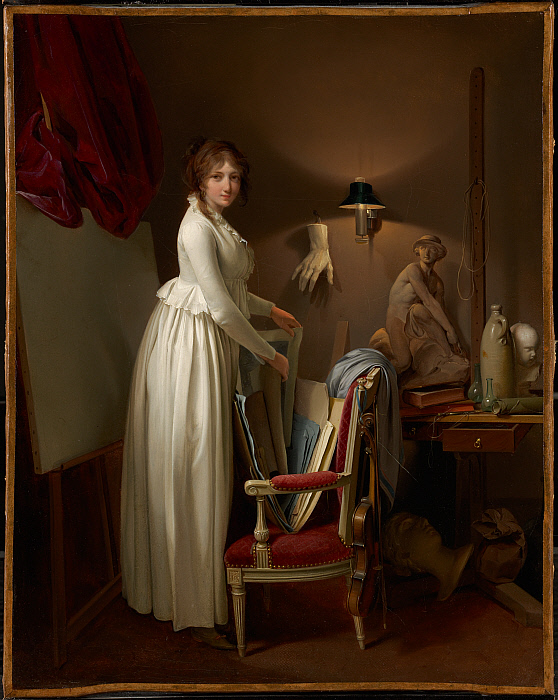
The Artist's Wife in His Studio (c.1795–99), Oil on canvas, 16 x 12 15/16 in. (40.6 x 32.9 cm), Clark Art Institute

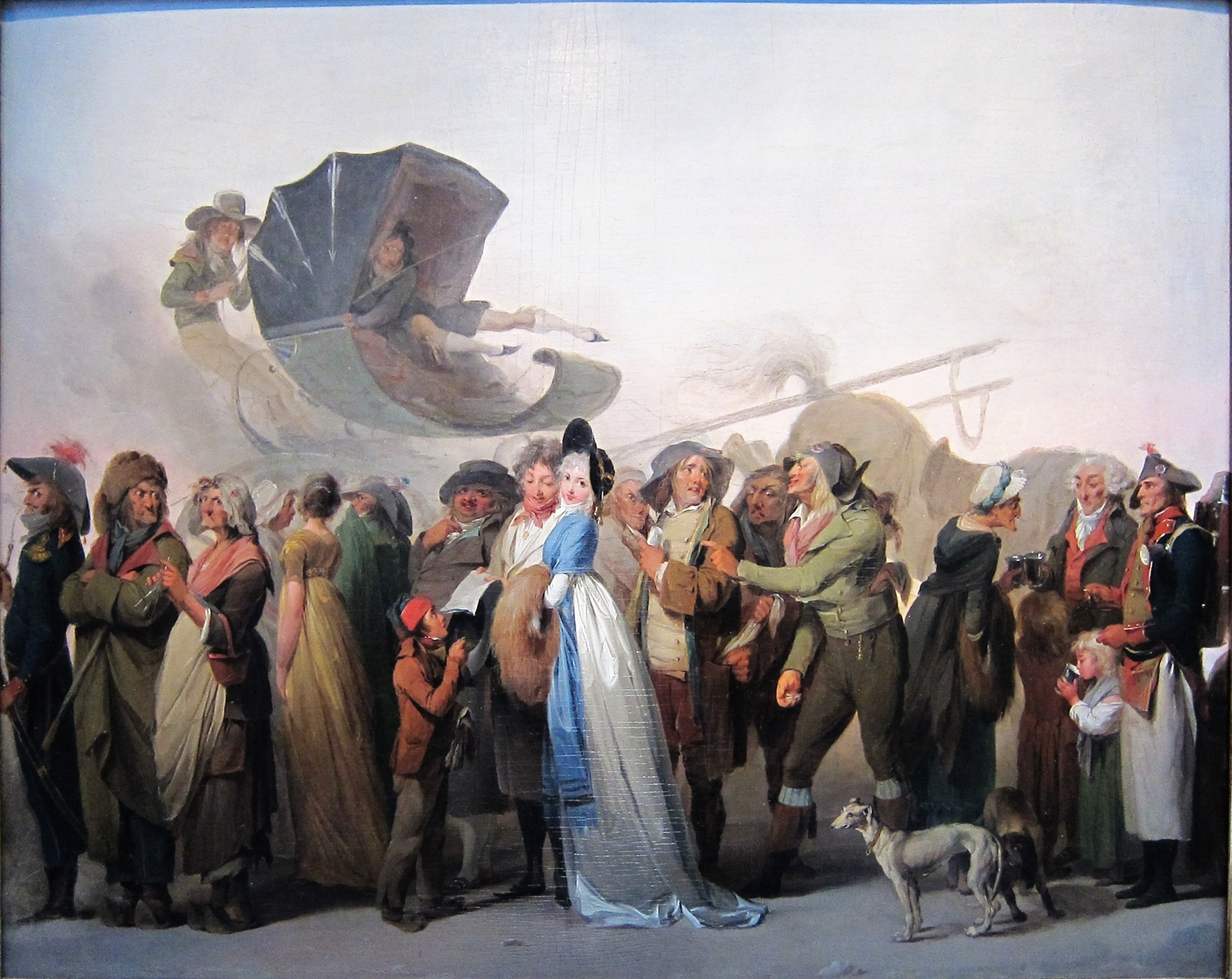
Incroyable parade, 1797

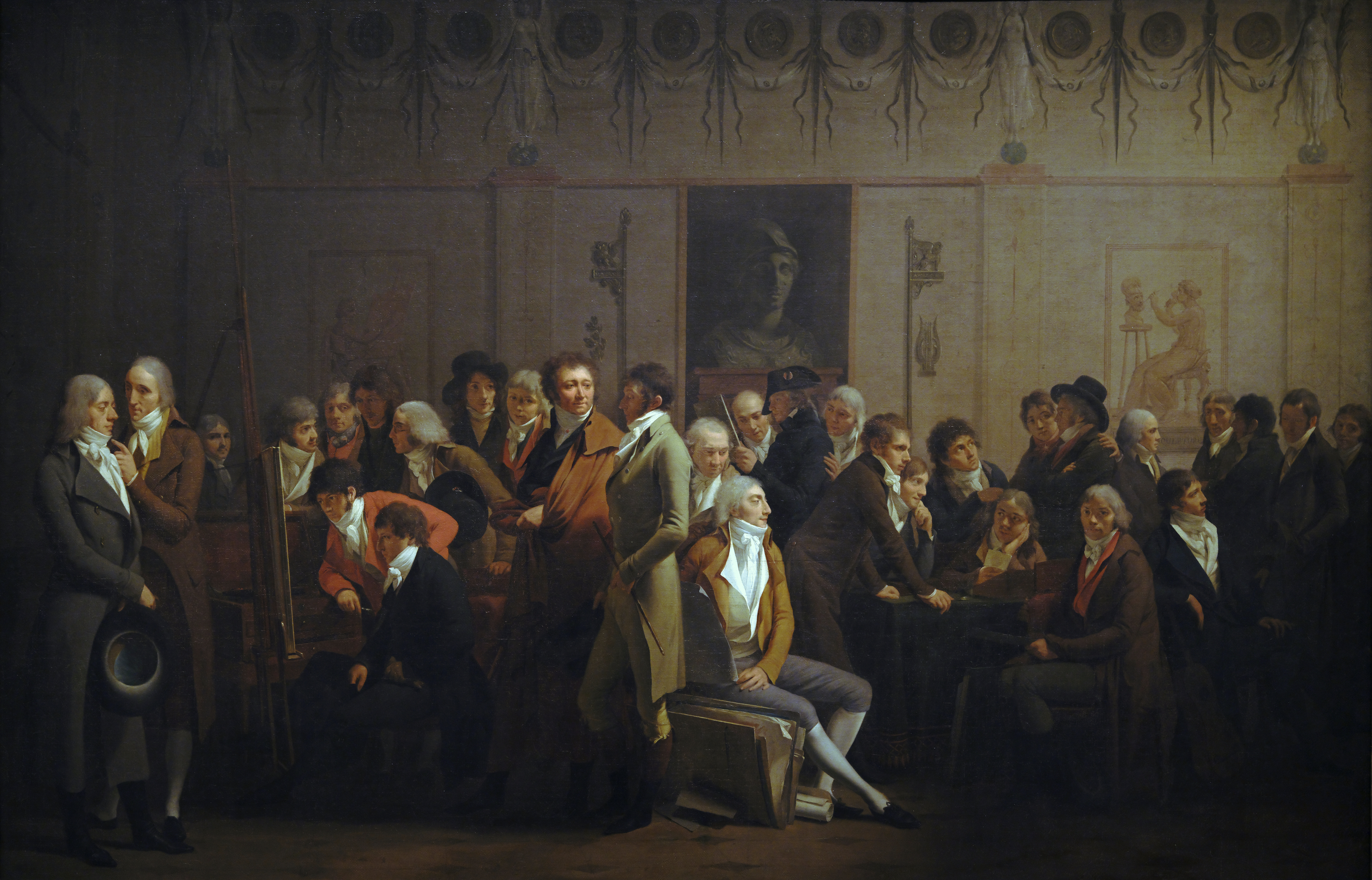
Meeting of Artists in Isabey's Studio, 1798

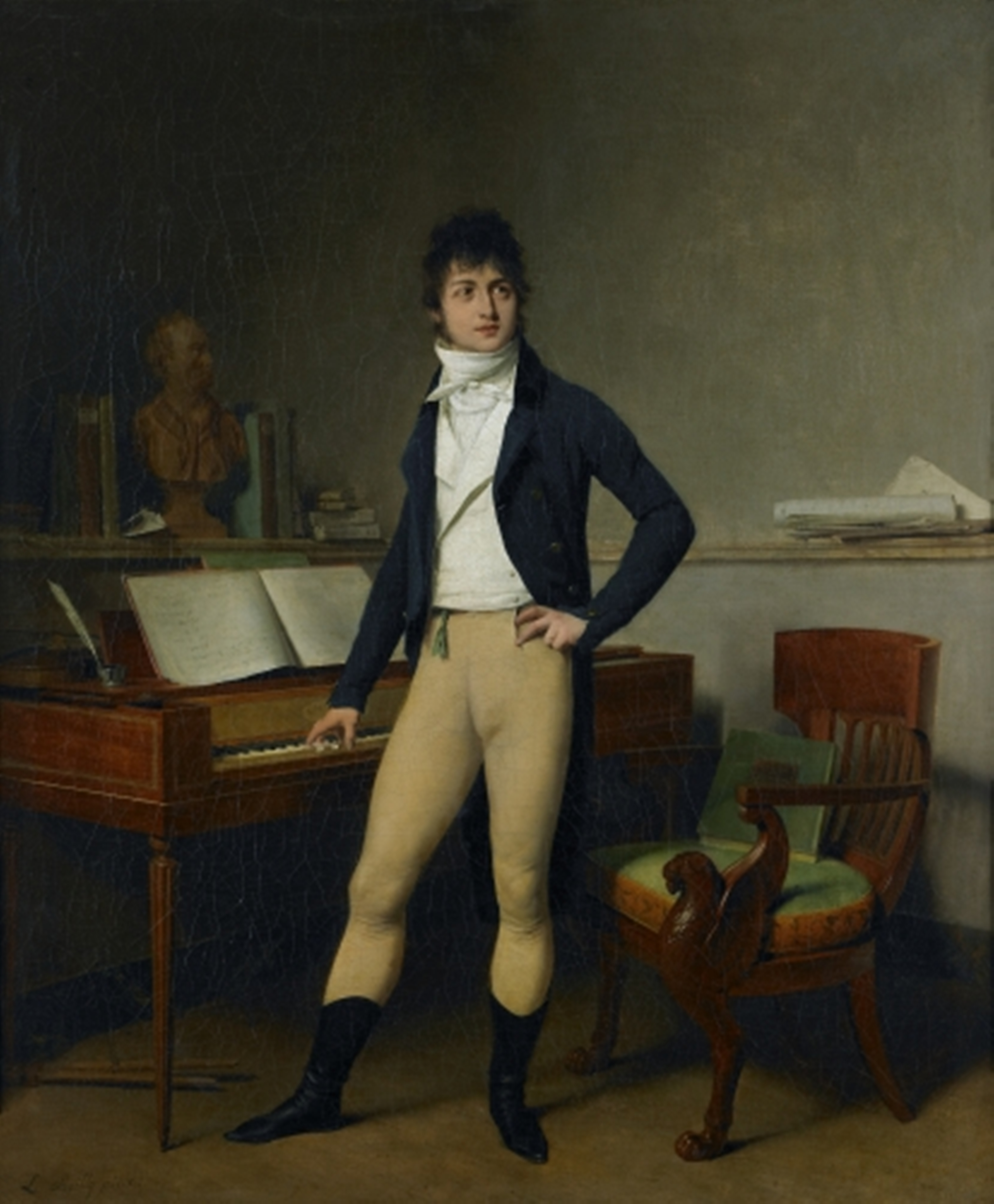
Portrait of François-Adrien Boieldieu, 1800

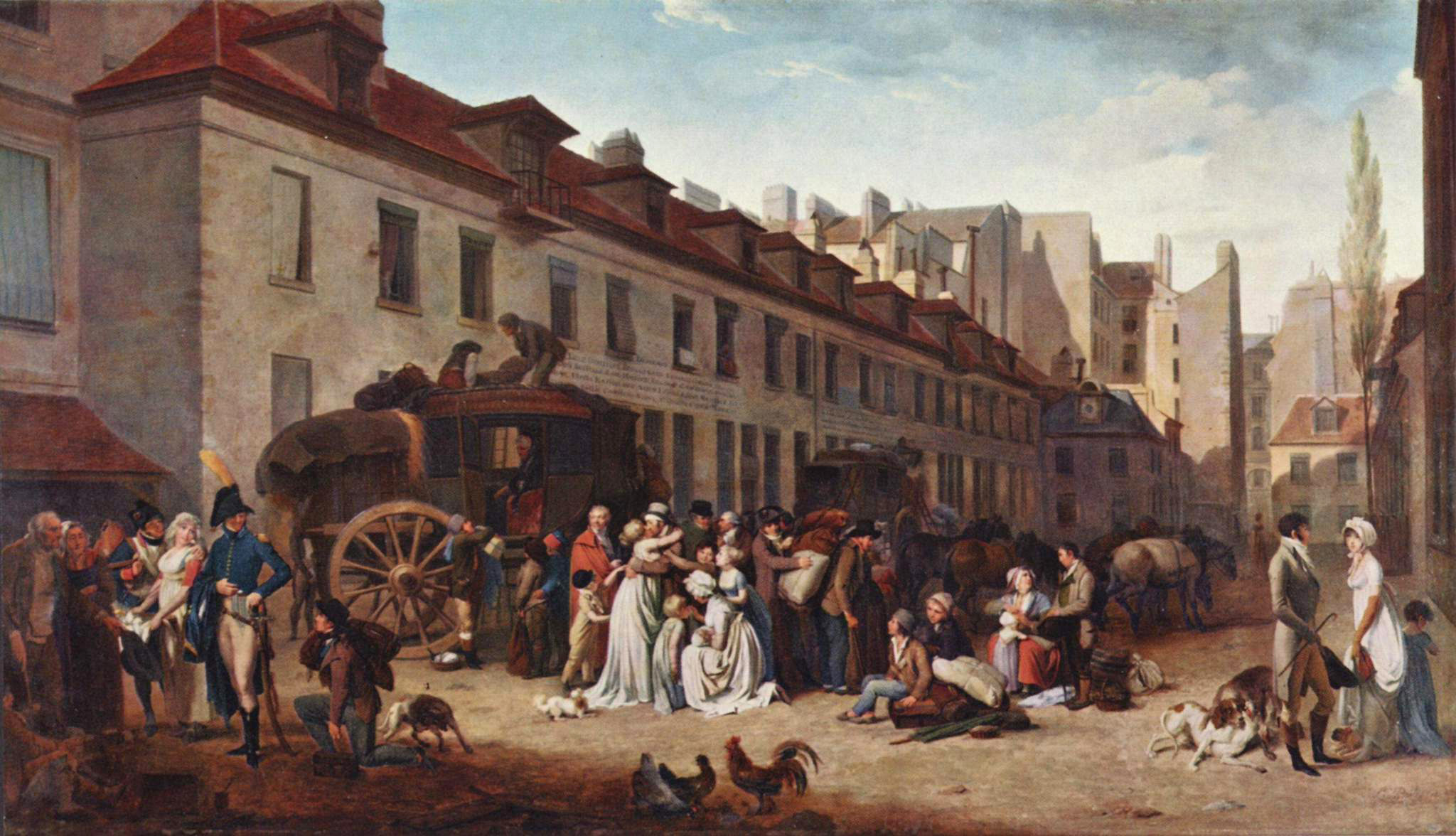
The Arrival of a Stagecoach in the Courtyard of the Messageries, 1803

Madame Saint-Ange Chevrier, 1807, Nationalmuseum

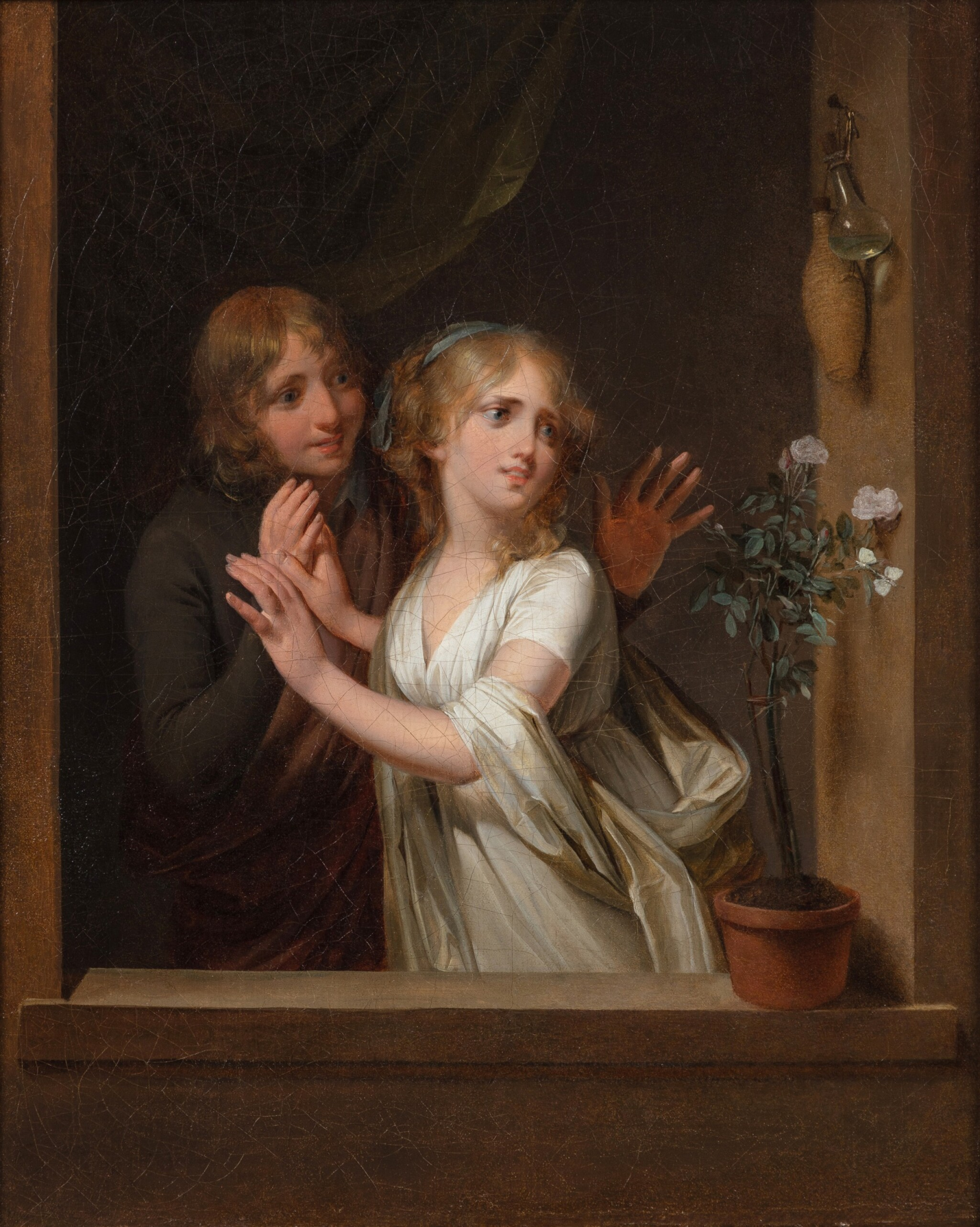
Les Papillons

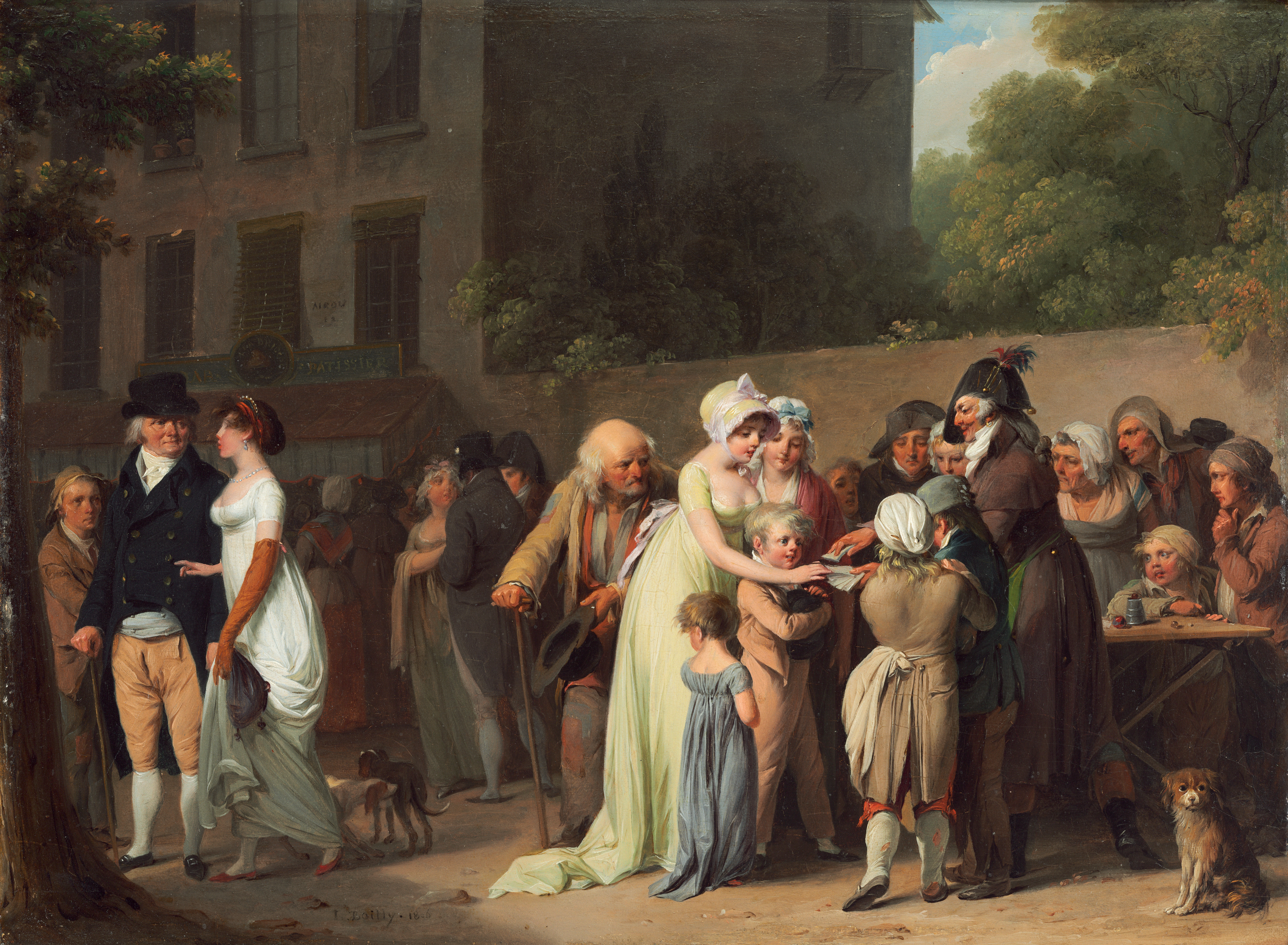
The Card Sharp on the Boulevard, 1806

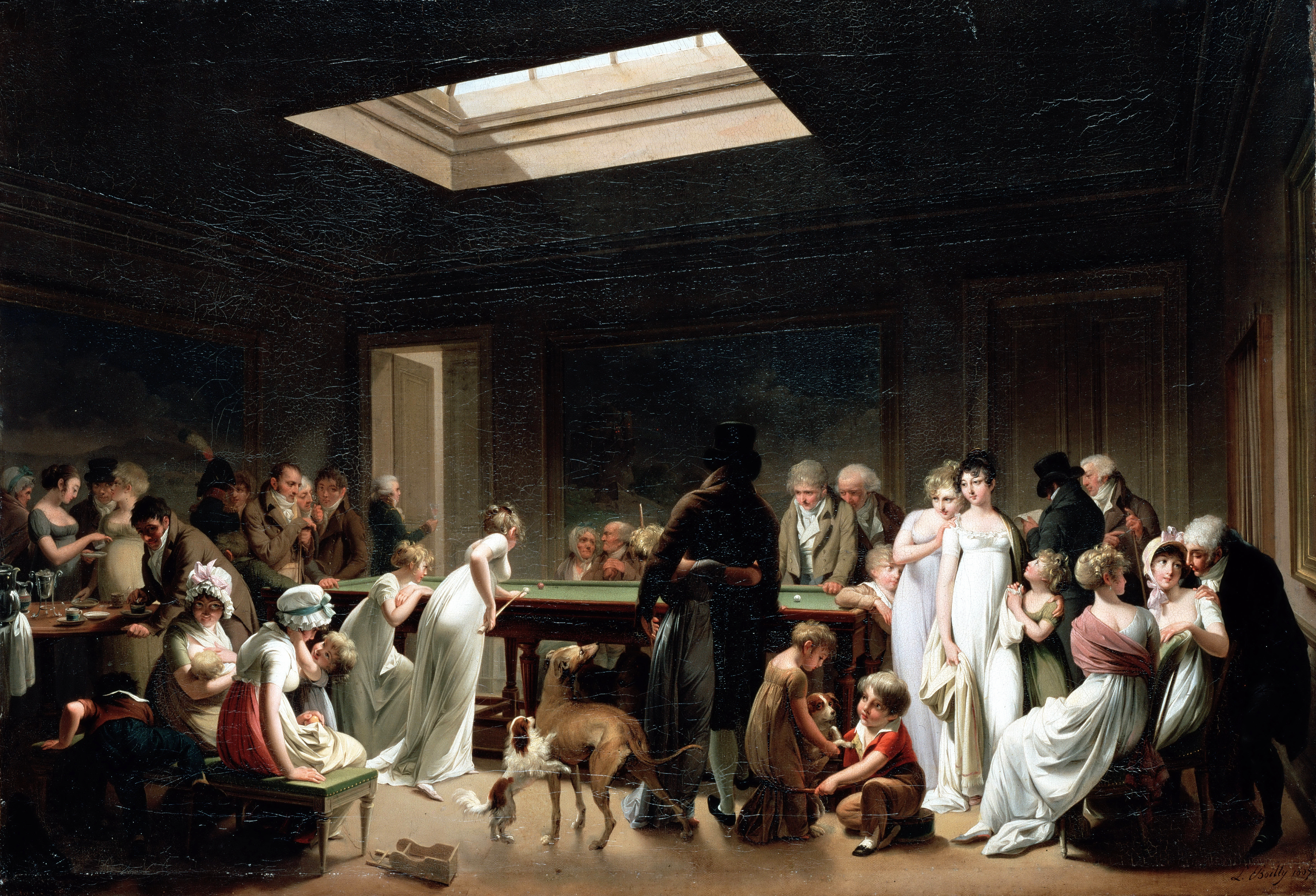
A Game of Billiards, 1807

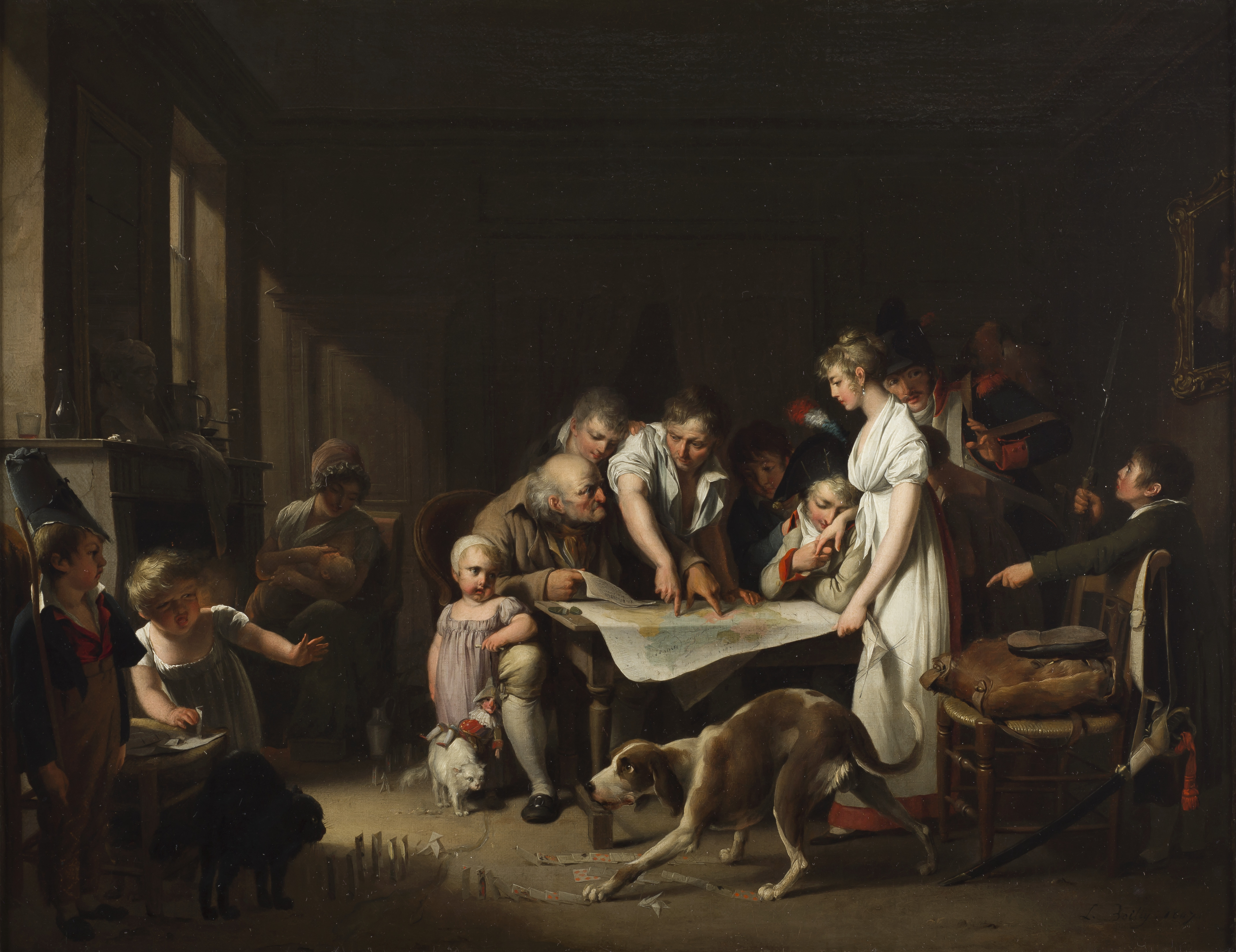
The Reading of the Bulletin of the Grande Armée, 1807

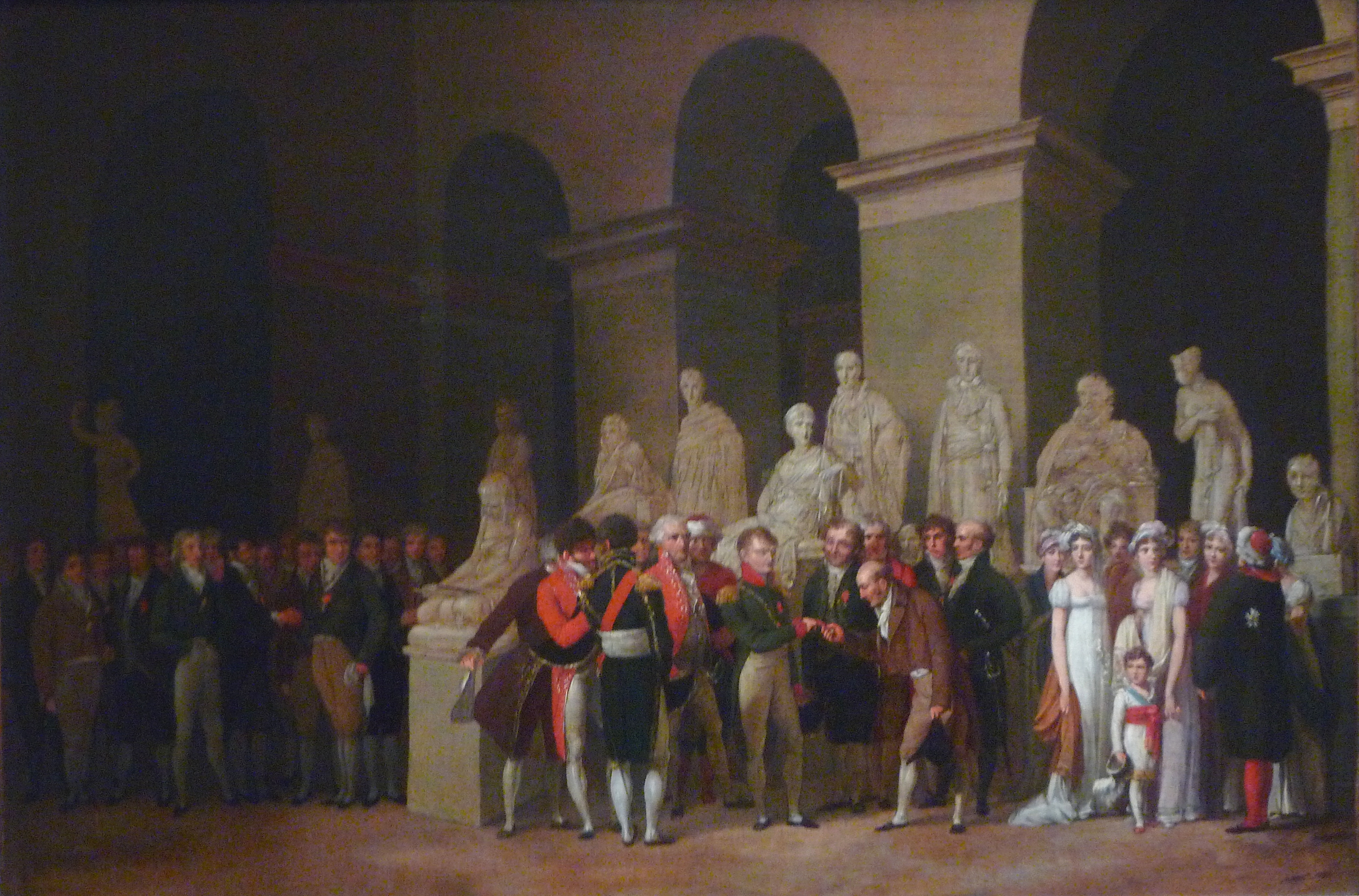
Napoleon Awarding the Legion of Honour to Pierre Cartellier, 1808

Departure of the Conscripts, 1808

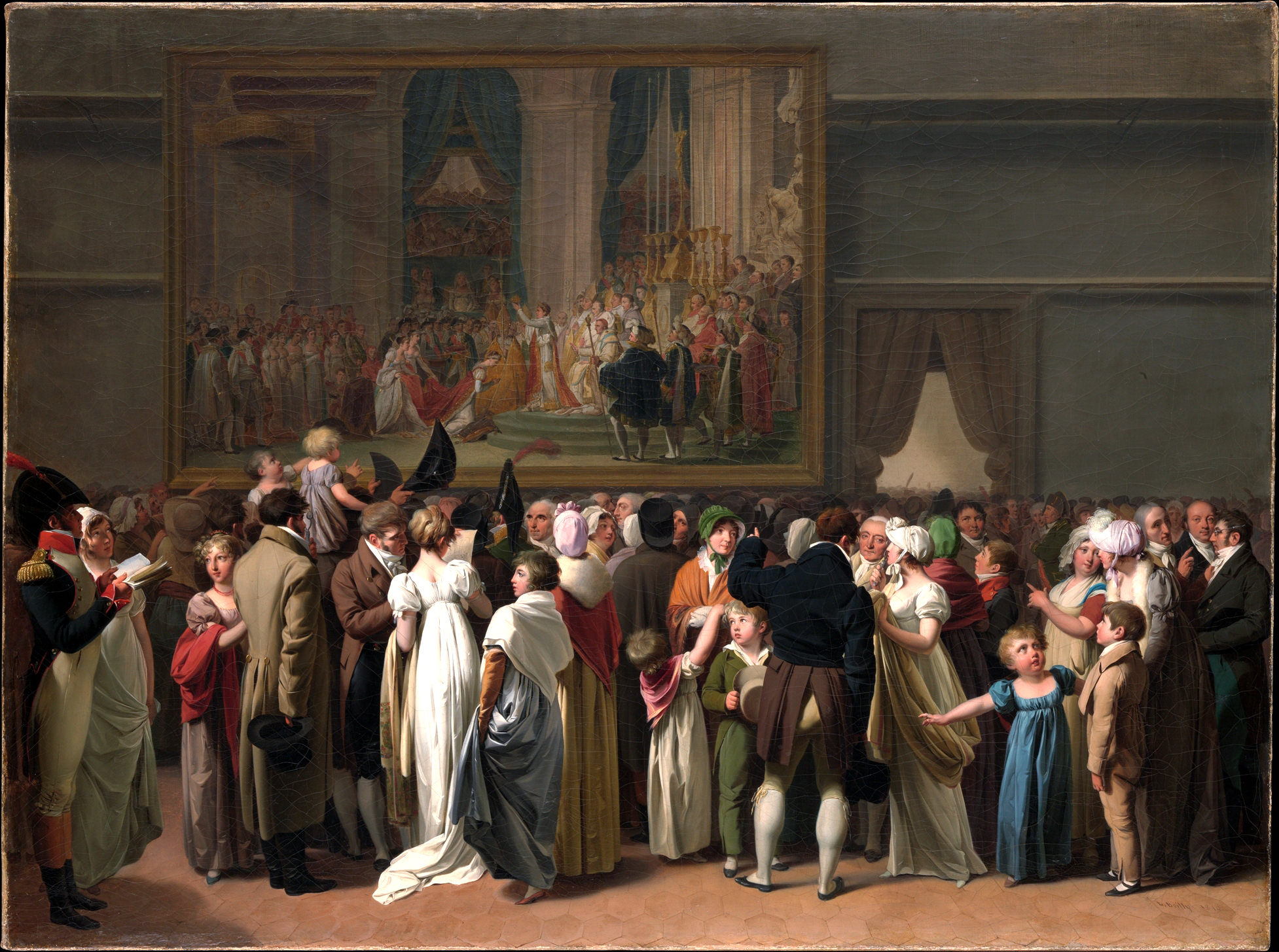
The Public Viewing David's 'Coronation' at the Louvre, 1810

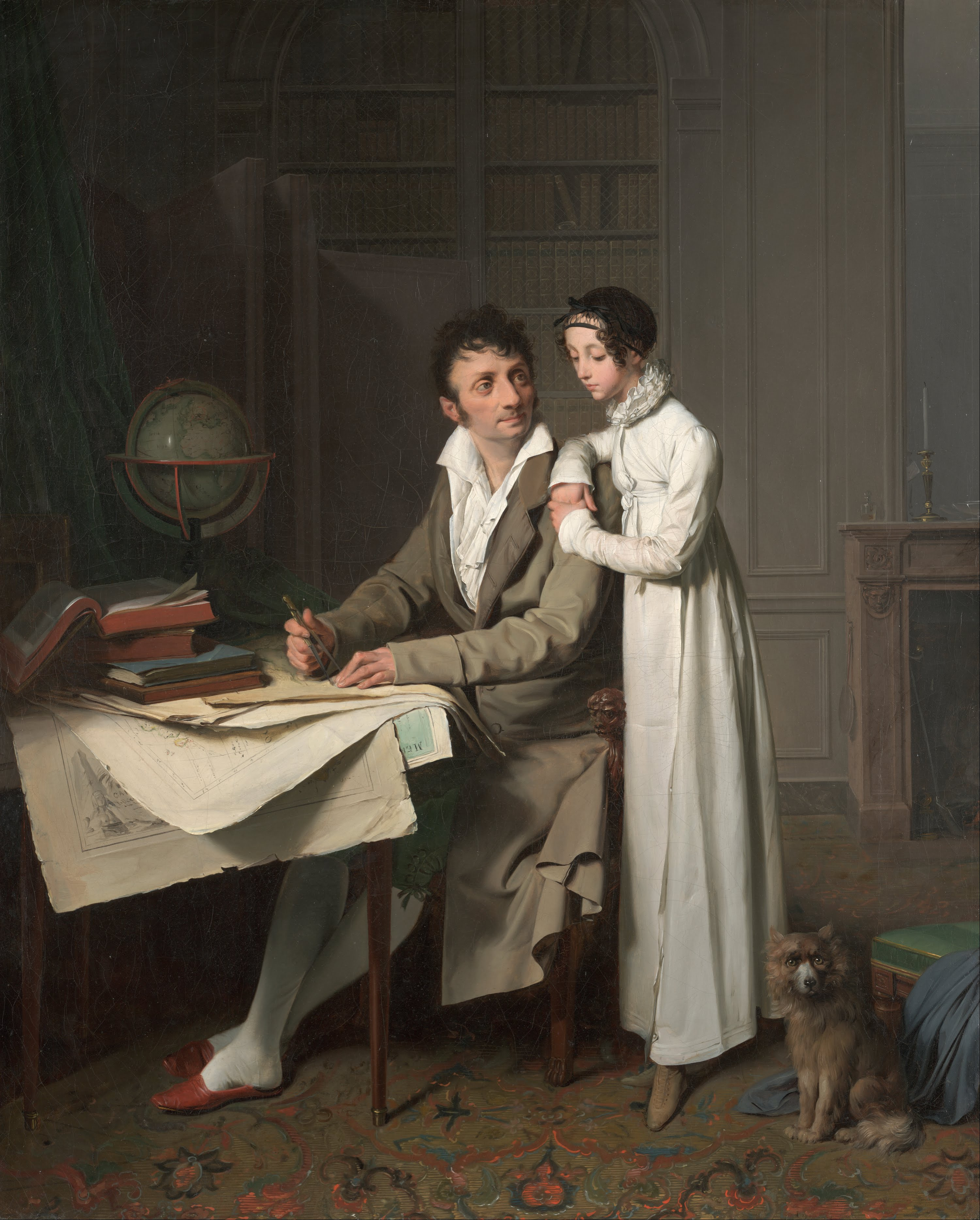
The Geography Lesson, 1812

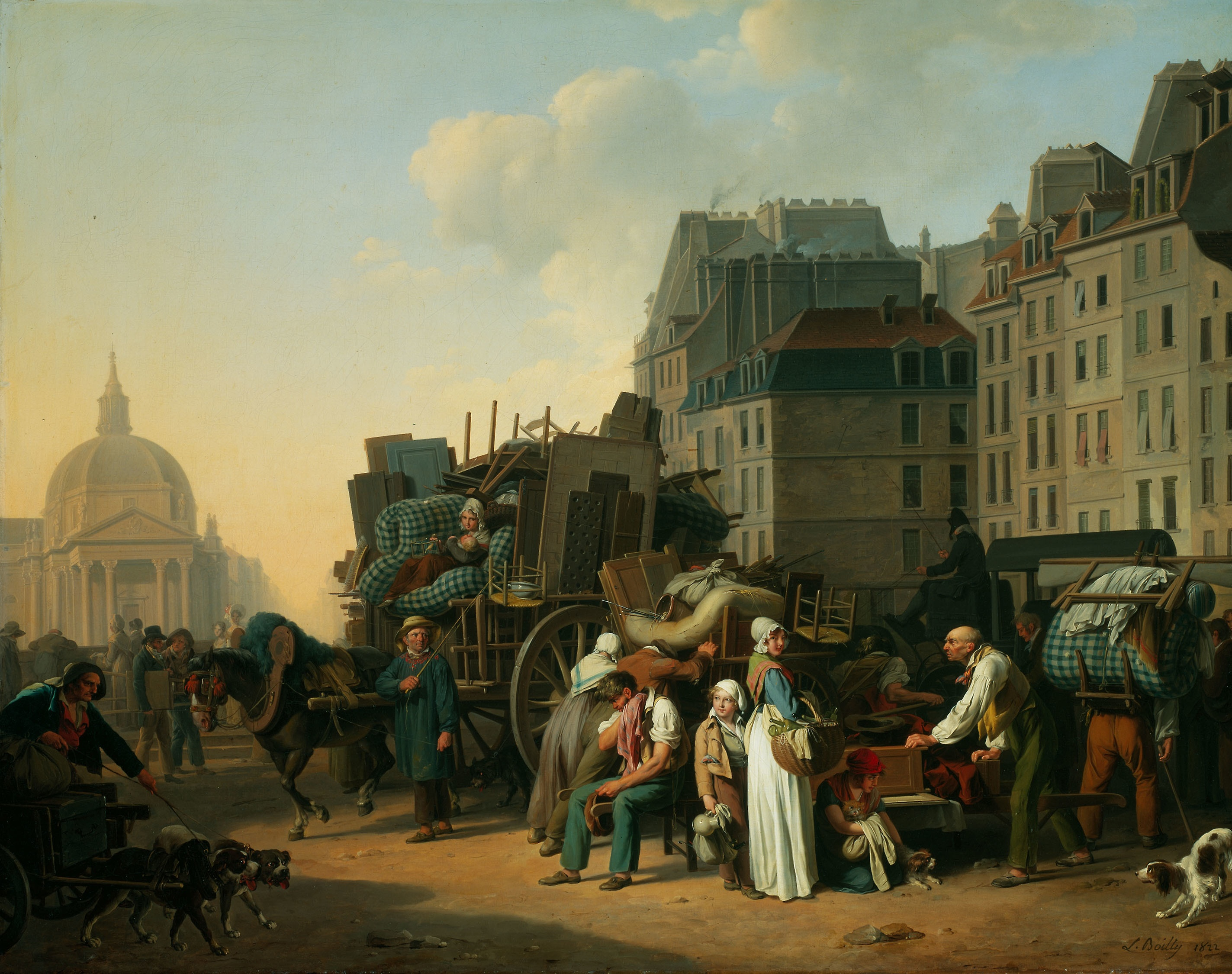
Moving Day, 1822

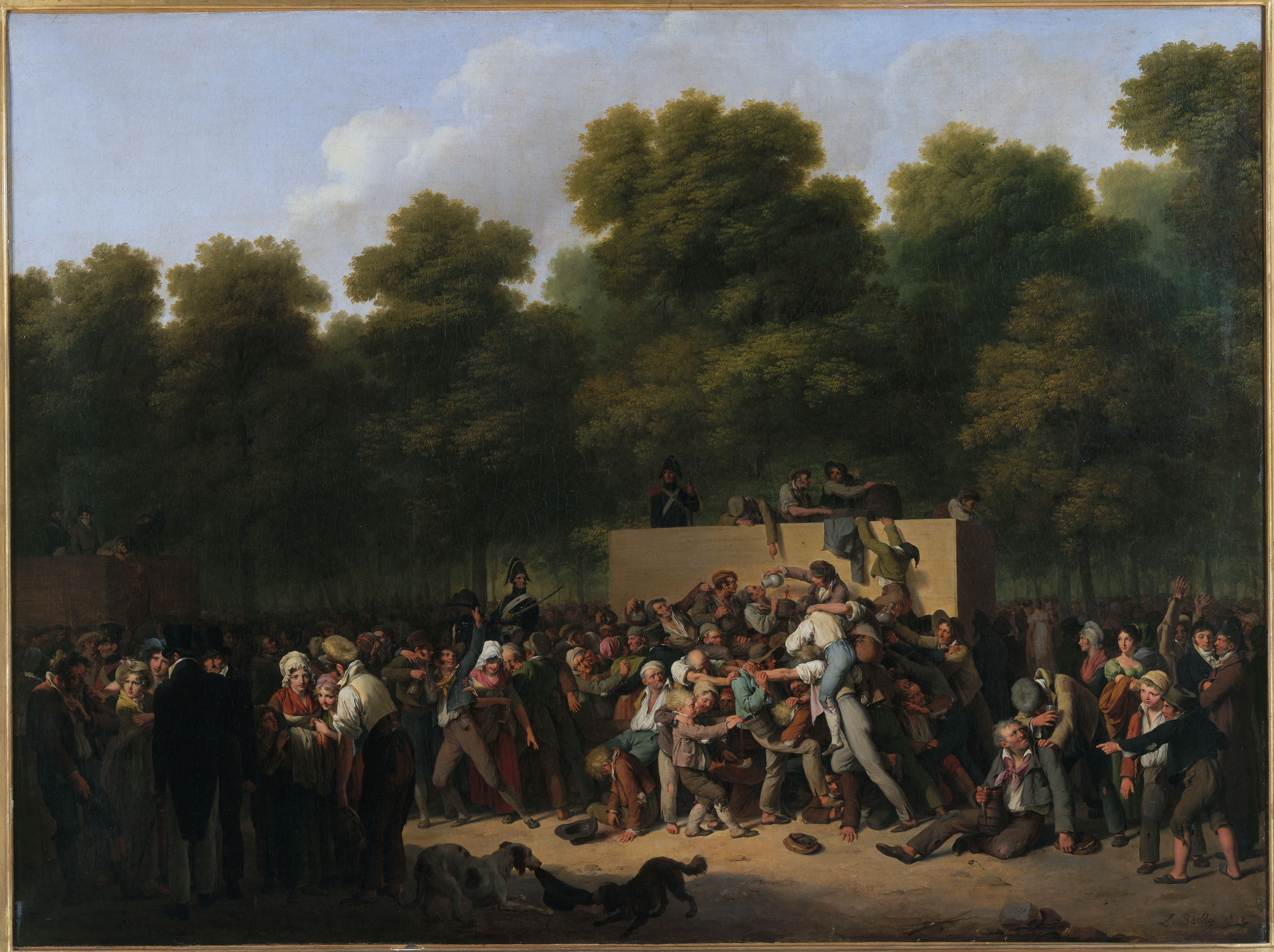
Distribution of Wine and Food on the Champs-Elysées, 1822

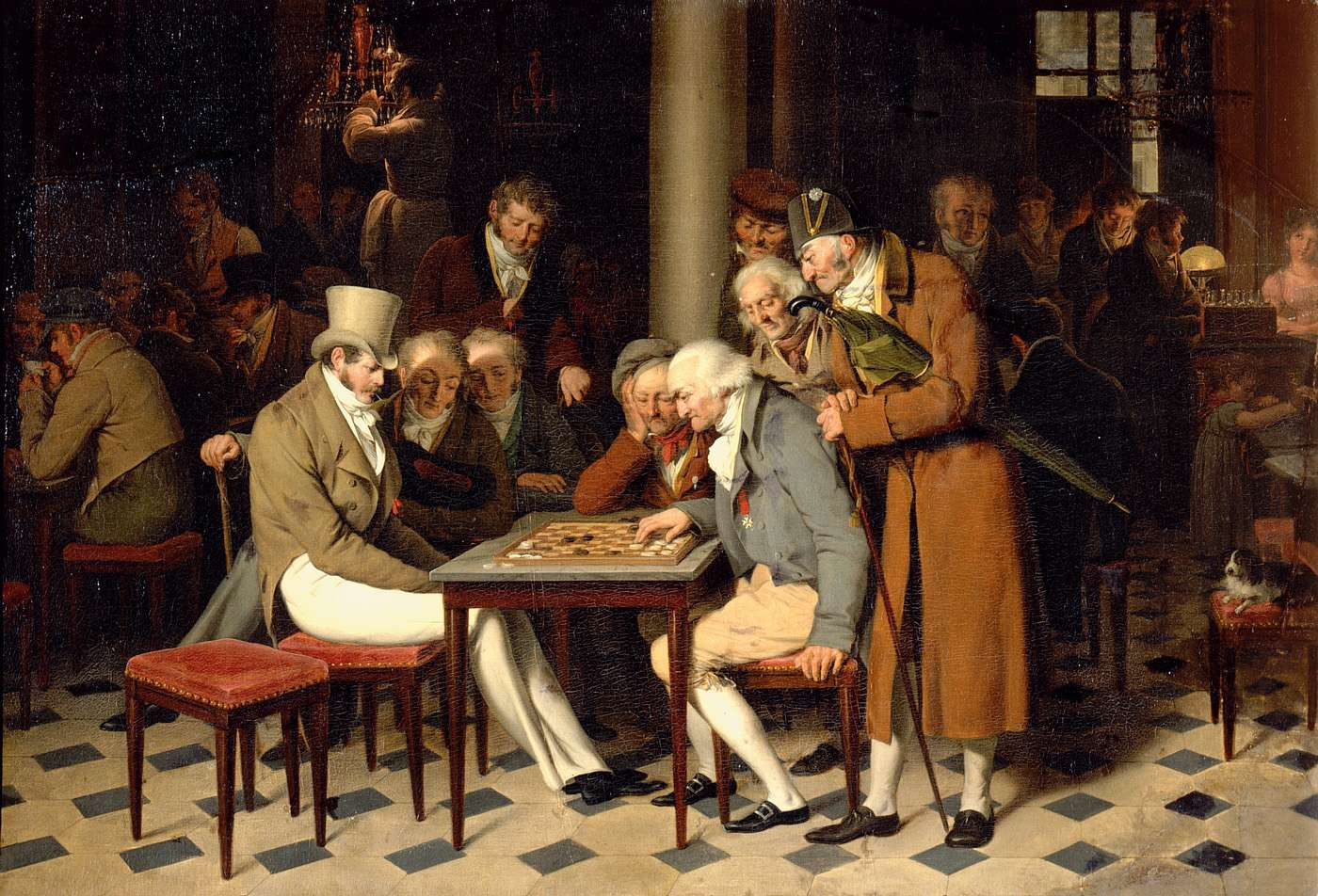
Checkers at the Lamblin Café in the Palais-Royal, 1824

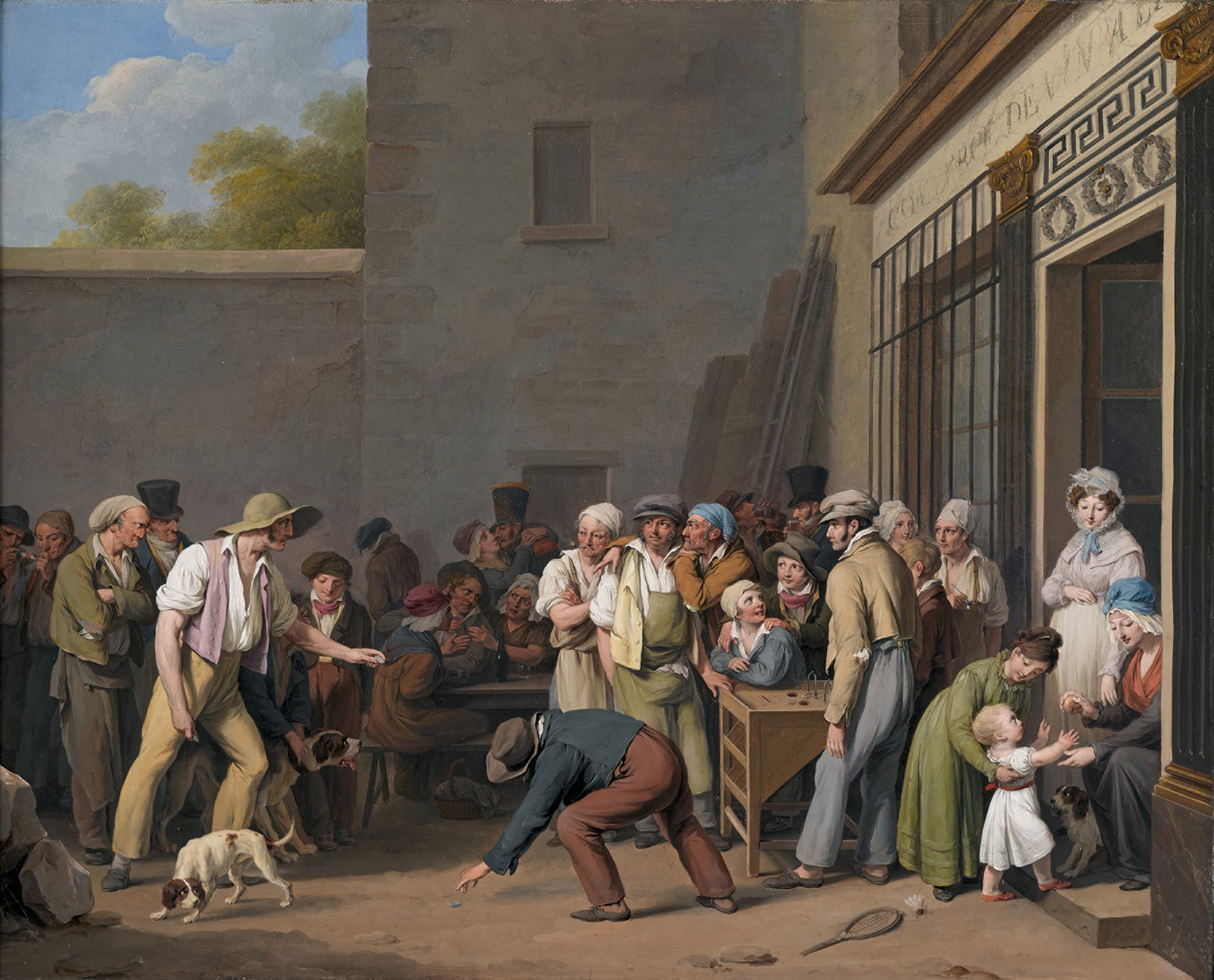
The Barrel Game, 1828

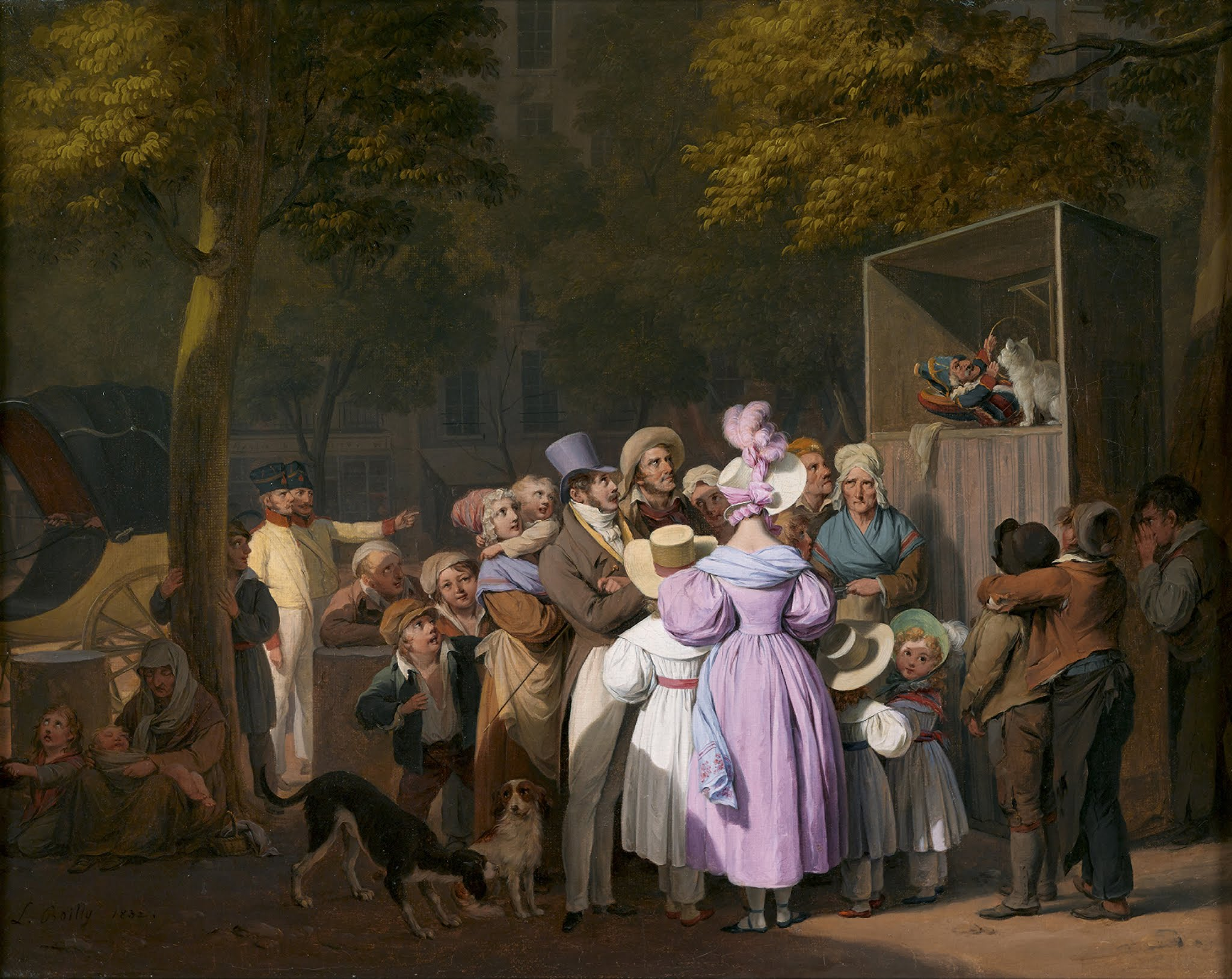
The Poor Cat, 1832

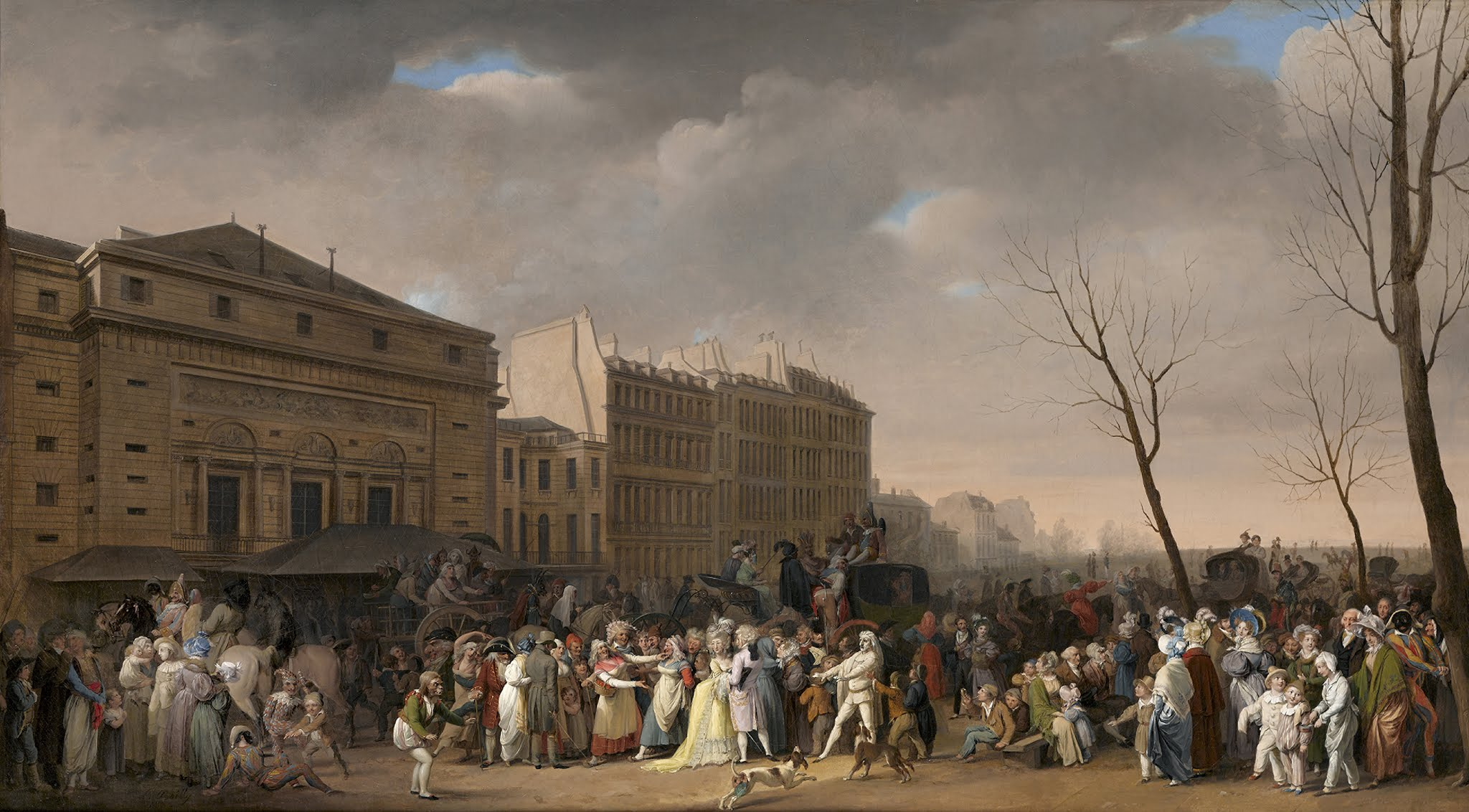
A Carnival Scene, 1832
