= 1808 in art =

Events in the year 1808 in Art.

== Events ==
- May 2 and May 3 – In Spain the guerrilla resistance movement against the French forces of Napoleon Bonaparte begins; immortalized in 1814 by Francisco Goya's Third of May 1808.
- May 2 – The Royal Academy Exhibition of 1808 opens at Somerset House in London
- April 5 – John James Audubon marries Lucy Bakewell.
- October 15 – The Salon of 1808 opens at the Louvre in Paris
- The Academy of Fine Arts, Munich, is given the title of Royal Academy of Fine Arts by King Maximilian I Joseph of Bavaria.
- The Rijksmuseum moves from The Hague to Amsterdam, where it is located temporarily at the Royal Palace.
- Thomas Phillips is elected to the Royal Academy.

== Works ==
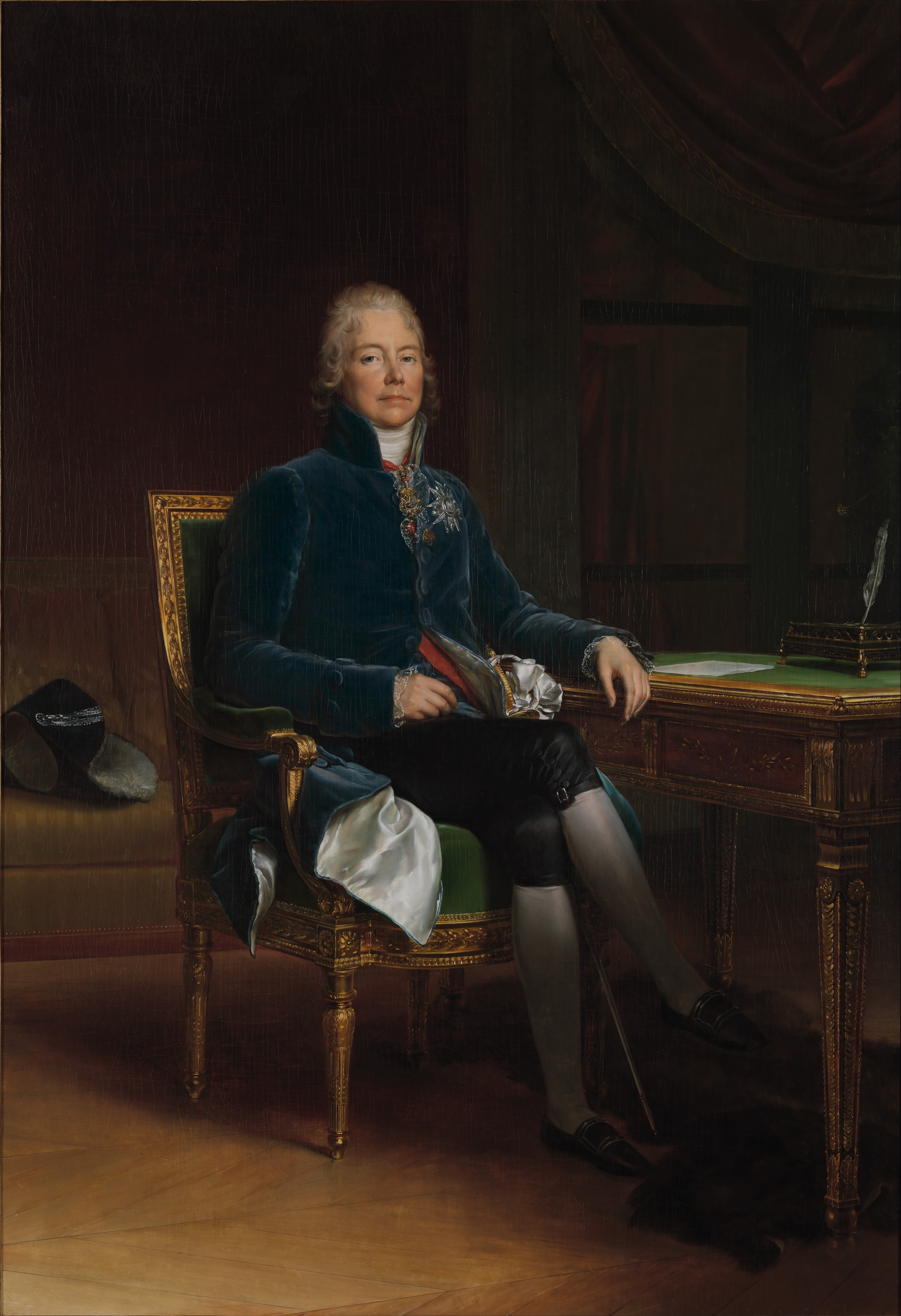
Portrait of Talleyrand by François Gérard

- René Théodore Berthon – Napoleon Receiving the Senate Deputies in Berlin
- Louis-Léopold Boilly – Departure of the Conscripts
- Antonio Canova – Venus Victrix (marble reclining nude)
- Richard Cosway – Portrait miniature of Arthur Wellesley
- François-Xavier Fabre
  - The Judgement of Paris
  - Lucien Bonaparte at the Villa Rufinella
- François Gérard
  - Portrait of Joseph Bonaparte
  - Portrait of Talleyrand
- James Gillray – The Spanish Bullfight
- Anne-Louis Girodet de Roussy-Trioson
  - The Burial of Atala
  - Napoleon Receiving the Keys of Vienna
  - François-René de Chateaubriand
  - Hortense de Beauharnais
- Antoine-Jean Gros
  - General Lasalle at the Siege of Stettin
  - Napoléon on the Battlefield of Eylau
- Jean Auguste Dominique Ingres
  - The Valpinçon Bather
  - Oedipus and the Sphinx
- Thomas Lawrence – Portrait of the Children of Ayscoghe Boucherett
- Thomas Phillips – Venus and Adonis
- Adolphe Roehn – The Meeting of Napoleon I and Tsar Alexander I at Tilsit
- J. M. W. Turner
  - The Battle of Trafalgar
  - Margate
  - Pope's Villa at Twickenham
  - The Forest of Bere
  - Sheerness as Seen from the Nore
  - Tabley, Windy Day
  - The Unpaid Bill
  - View of Richmond Hill and Bridge

== Publications ==
- Johann Dominicus Fiorillo – Geschichte der zeichnenden Künste.
- Robert Blair – The Grave, with illustrations from designs by William Blake (including A Vision of the Last Judgment).
- Augustus Charles Pugin & Thomas Rowlandson – Volume 1 of The Microcosm of London, illustrated in aquatint from watercolours produced jointly by Pugin & Rowlandson and published by Rudolph Ackermann in London.

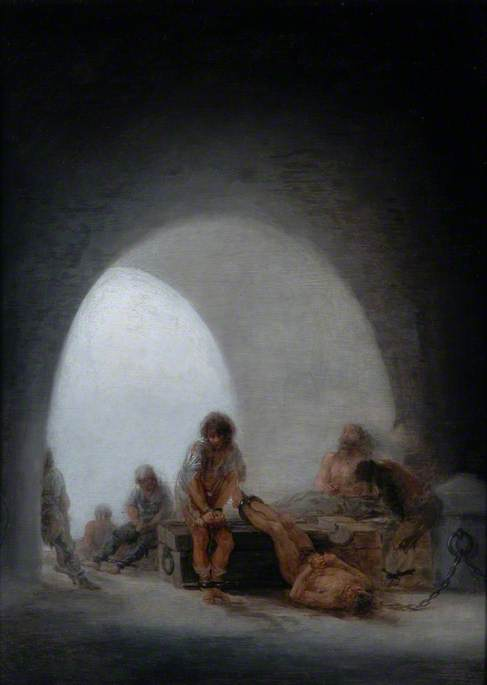
Goya – Prison Interior. 42.9 cm x 31.7 cm, Bowes Museum, Barnard Castle

== Births ==
- February 5 – Carl Spitzweg, German Biedermeier painter (died 1885)
- February 26 – Honoré Daumier, French painter, sculptor and illustrator (died 1879)
- March 6 – Sofia Adlersparre, Swedish painter (died 1862)
- July 12 – Edward Troye, Swiss-born American equine painter (died 1874)
- December 14 – Édouard De Bièfve, Belgian painter (died 1882)
- Date unknown – Nikola Aleksić, Serbian portraitist in the Biedermeier artistic tradition and the Nazarene movement of 19th century German painters (died 1873)

== Deaths ==
- February 10 – Hugh Douglas Hamilton, Irish portrait artist (born 1740)
- March 1 – Fredrika Eleonora von Düben, Swedish textile artist, member of the Royal Swedish Academy of Arts (born 1738)
- March 3 – Anton von Maron, Austrian painter active in Rome (born 1733)
- April 10 – Jean-Laurent Mosnier, French painter and miniaturist (born 1743)
- April 15 – Hubert Robert, French painter (born 1733)
- April 26 – Jean-Baptiste Pillement, French Rococo painter, designer and engraver (born 1728)
- June 1 – Jacques Kuyper, Dutch printmaker, painter, draftsman, watercolourist, etcher, musician, and composer (born 1761)
- June 6 – Magdalene Bärens, Danish still life and flower painter (born 1737)
- December 4 – Karl Ludwig Fernow, German art critic (born 1763)
- December 18 – Christina Chalon, Dutch painter and etcher (born 1748)
- December 22 – Samuel Shelley, English miniaturist and watercolour painter (born 1750)
