= Margate (disambiguation) =

Margate is a coastal resort in the county of Kent, in the United Kingdom.

Margate may also refer to:

== Places ==
=== Australia ===
- Margate, Queensland, Australia
- Margate, Tasmania, Australia

=== Canada ===
- Margate, Prince Edward Island, Canada

=== South Africa ===
- Margate, KwaZulu-Natal, South Africa

=== United States ===
- Margate, Florida, US
- Margate City, New Jersey, US

== Music ==
- Margate (band), a Southern California melodic rock band
- "Margate" (song), by Chas & Dave, 1982

== Other uses ==
- Margate (painting), an 1808 work by the British artist J.M.W. Turner
- Margate, a fish in the family Haemulidae
