= Nore =

Sandbank at the mouth of the Thames Estuary

Coordinates: 51°28′30″N 0°46′40″E

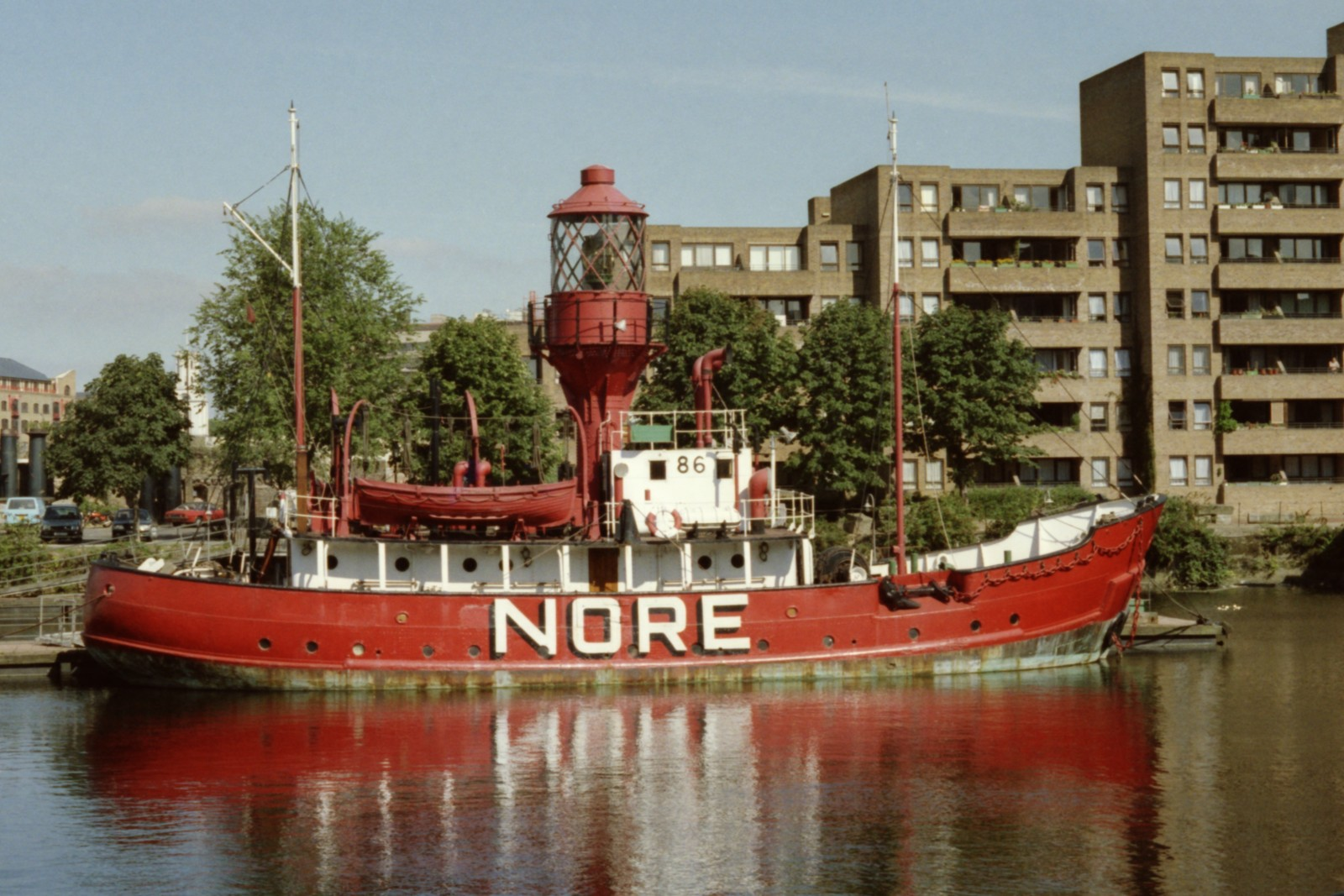
Lightship Nore

The Nore is a long bank of sand and silt running along the south-centre of the final narrowing of the Thames Estuary, England. Its south-west is the very narrow Nore Sand. Just short of the Nore's easternmost point where it fades into the channels it has a notable point once marked by a lightship on the line where the estuary of the Thames nominally becomes the North Sea. A lit buoy today stands on this often map-marked divisor: between Havengore Creek in east Essex and Warden Point on the Isle of Sheppey in Kent.

Until 1964 it marked the seaward limit of the Port of London Authority. As the sandbank was a major hazard for shipping coming in and out of London, in 1732 it received the world's first lightship. This became a major landmark, and was used as an assembly point for shipping. Today it is marked by the Sea Reach No. 1 Buoys.

The Nore is an anchorage, or open roadstead, which was used by the Royal Navy's North Sea Fleet, and to its local Command. It was the site of a notorious mutiny in 1797. The Great Nore is the cul-de-sac deep channel to the south of the Nore which opens out to the locally most deep water to the east, the Sheerness Approach.

== Lightship and shape of shoal ==
The Nore is a hazard to shipping, so in 1732 the world's first lightship was moored over it in an experiment by Robert Hamblin, who patented the idea. This proved to be successful, and by 1819 England had nine lightships. The Nore lightship was run by Trinity House, the general lighthouse authority for England, Wales, the Channel Islands and Gibraltar.

The early Nore lightships were small wooden vessels, often Dutch-built galliots. By the end of the 19th century a larger ship with a revolving light had been instituted, but after about 1915 the authorities ceased to use one. Sea Reach No. 1 Buoy, as at 2006, marks the anchorage-point where the No. 3 lightship stood, about midway between Shoeburyness, Essex and Sheerness, Kent.

The earlier line crossing the deeper eastern part of the shoal where No. 1 lightship stood, the line between Havengore Creek, Essex and Warden Point, Kent remains the nominal (conventional) limit of the Thames with the North Sea.

Admiralty Chart No. 1975 Kentish Knock and the Naze to The Nore, published 1934

== Royal Navy ==
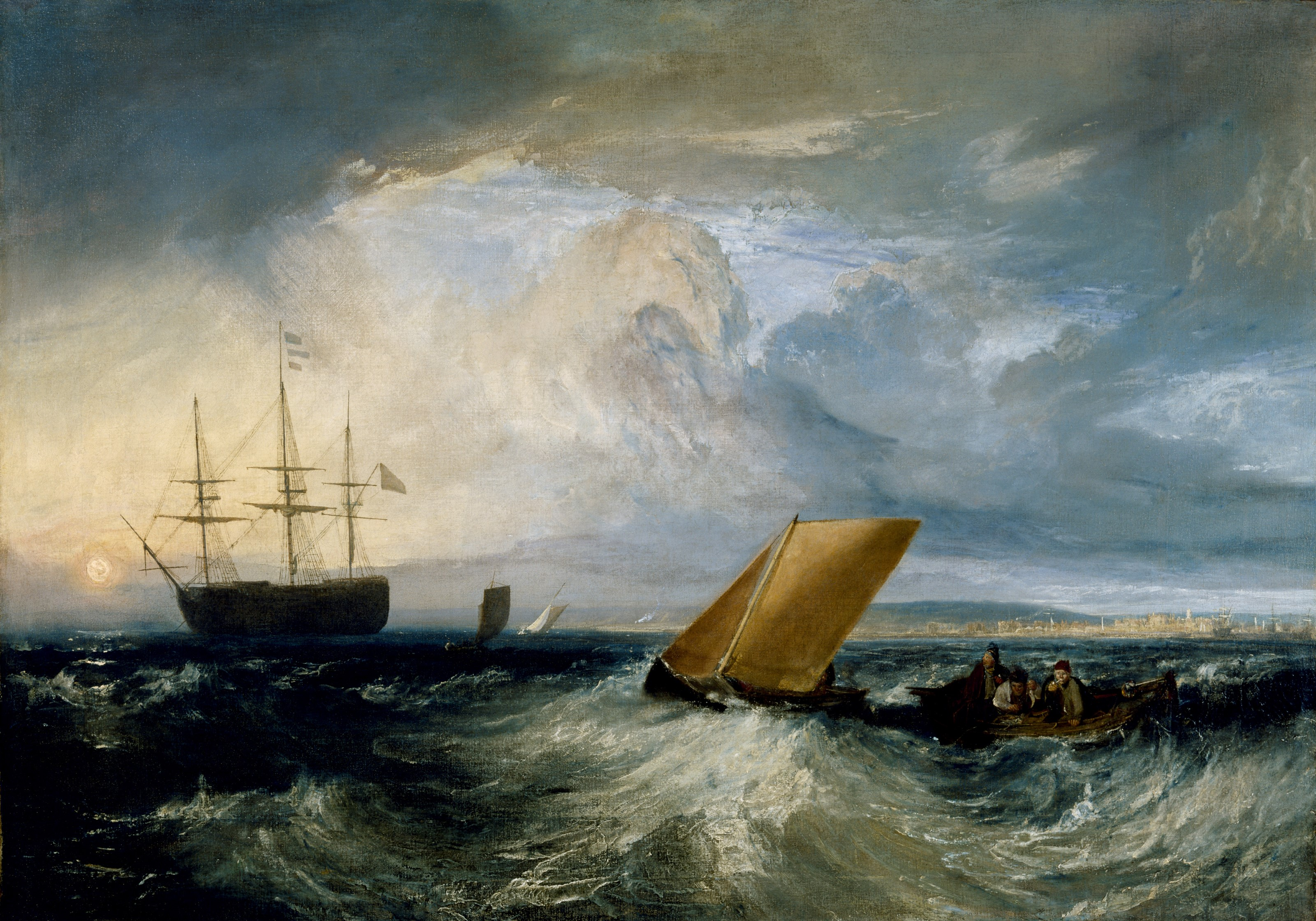
Sheerness as Seen from the Nore by J. M. W. Turner, 1808

The Nore has been the site of a Royal Navy anchorage since the Age of Sail, being adjacent to both the city and port of London and to the Medway, England's principal naval base and dockyard on the North Sea.

During the French Revolutionary War it was the scene of a notorious mutiny, when seamen protesting against their poor pay and working conditions refused orders and seized control of their ships in May 1797. The mutiny ended in June, and the ringleaders were punished. Due to the earlier, successful mutiny at Spithead, much was done by the Admiralty to improve pay and conditions for the seamen throughout the navy.

In 1804, Jonathan Martin, would-be York Minster arsonist, was stationed aboard the 74-gun HMS Hercule here.

From 1899 to 1955, the Royal Navy maintained a Commander-in-Chief, The Nore, a senior officer responsible for protecting the entrance to the port of London, and merchant traffic along the east coast of Britain. In the First World War the Nore Command principally had a supply and administrative function, but in the Second World War it oversaw naval operations in the North Sea along the East coast of Britain, guarding against invasion and protecting trade.

== Fort ==
Also during the Second World War a series of defensive towers known as Maunsell Forts was built in the Thames estuary to protect the approach to London from air and sea attack. The Nore was the site of one of these, the Great Nore Tower. It was equipped with a battery of anti-aircraft guns and crewed by a unit of the British Army. It was completed in 1943, but was abandoned at the end of hostilities. It was badly damaged in a collision in 1953 and dismantled in 1959–1960.
