= Forest of Bere =

Royal forest in Hampshire, England

Coordinates: 50°54′N 1°02′W

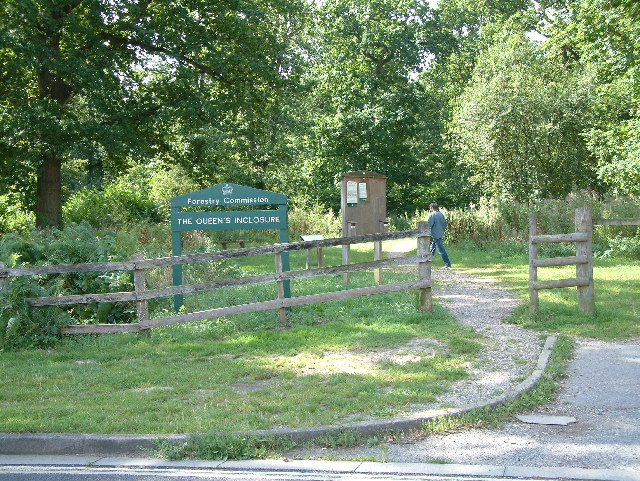
The Queen's Inclosure between the joined suburban settlements of Waterlooville and Cowplain

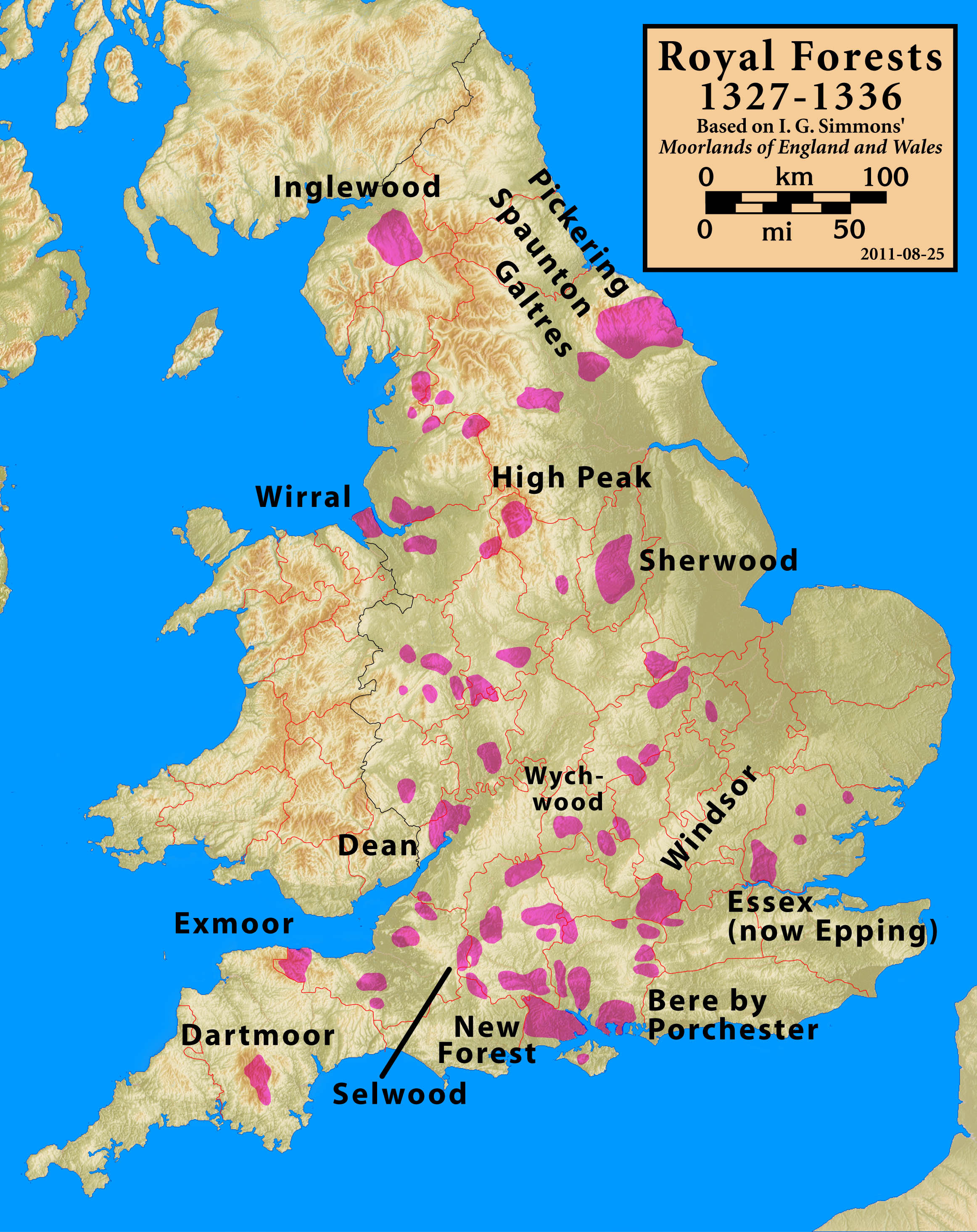

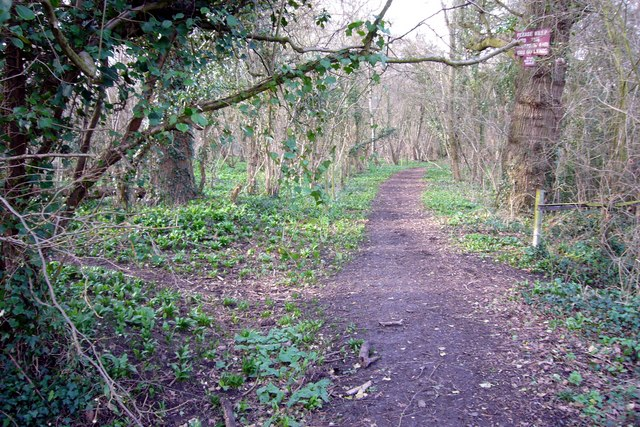
Bushy Coppice at the eastern end of the area

The Forest of Bere is a mixed-use partially forested area in Hampshire immediately north of Fareham, Portsmouth and Roman Road, Havant and including a small part of the South Downs National Park.

The former uninterrupted forest is now a mix of woodland, open space, ponds, streams, heathland, farmland and downland interspersed by minor villages and the major settlements of Waterlooville (with Cowplain) and Eastleigh (with Chandlers Ford). There are a number of paths and bridleways for walking and cycling. In the southern portion, towards the area south of the Queen Elizabeth Country Park, conifer plantations were created in the 20th century.

Not to be confused with the former royal Forest of Bere in Dorset.

== History ==
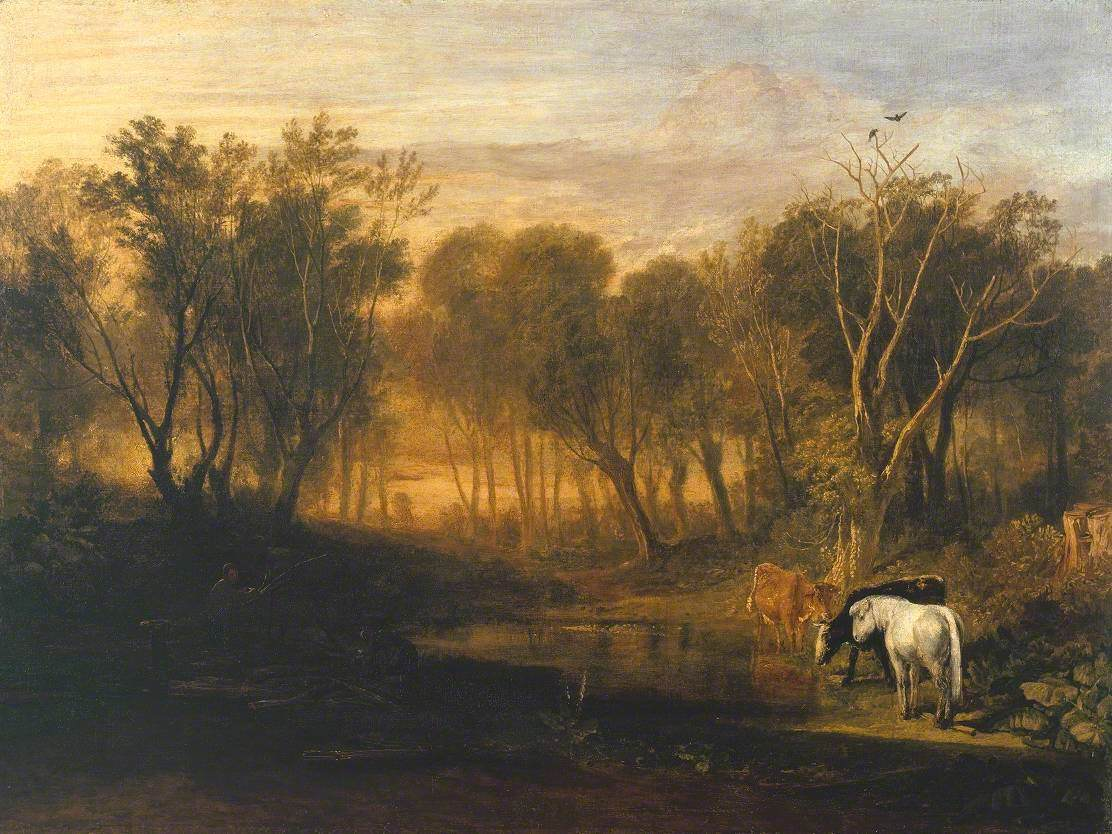
The Forest of Bere by J.M.W. Turner, 1808

In the 13th and 14th centuries, two royal forests formed a greater forerunner of the later vestigial forest between the New Forest and the Sussex border. North of Southampton between the rivers Test and Itchen was the Royal Forest of Bere Ashley. North of Portsmouth between the River Meon and the suburb of Bedhampton was the Royal Forest of Bere Portchester.

== Woodland habitats and contiguous country parks ==
Listed from east to west, excluding small copses and coppices

- Southleigh Forest
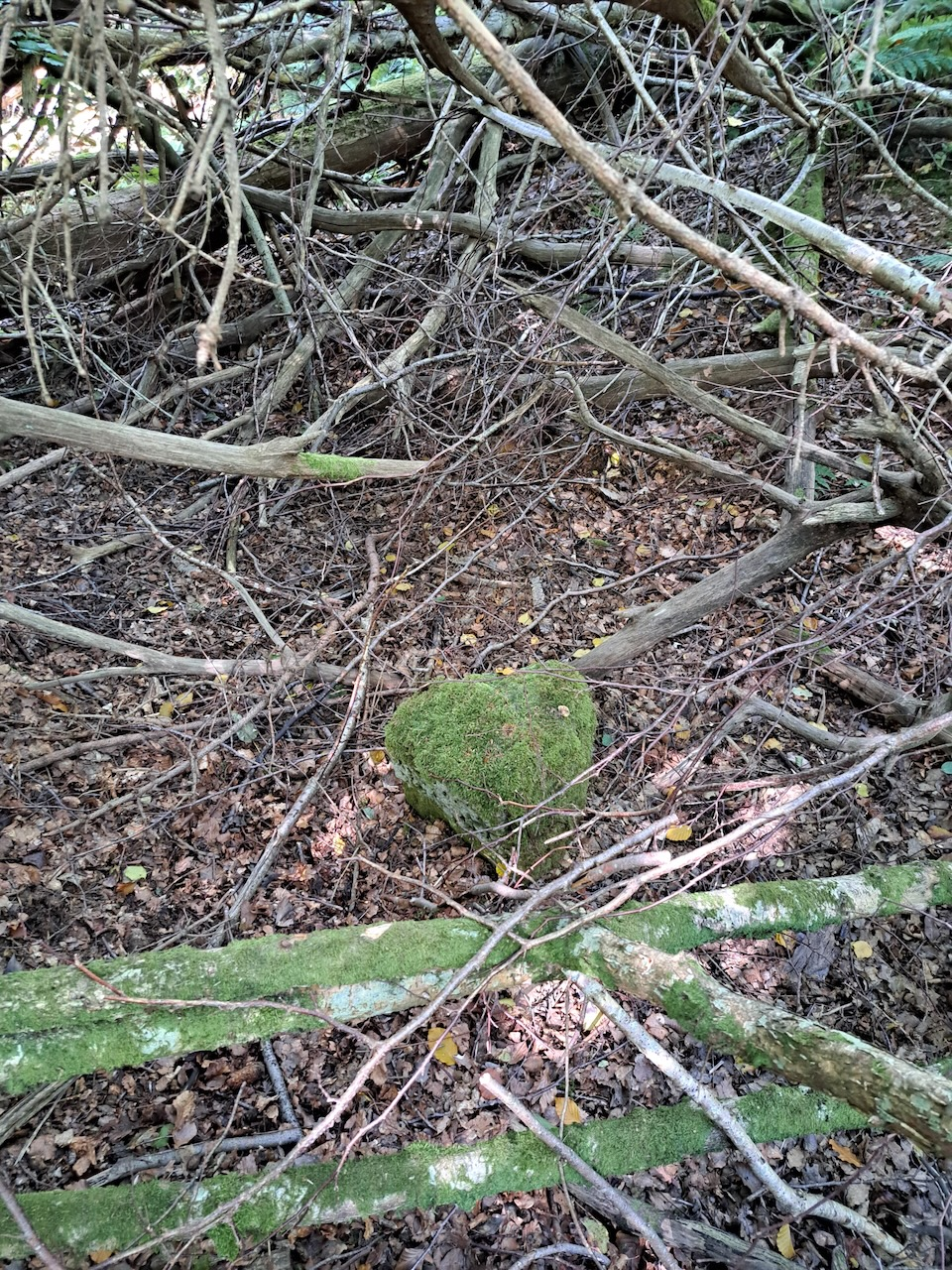
  Gunter's Stone, a mediaeval marker on the Hampshire-Sussex boundary in Southleigh Forest
- Staunton Country Park
- The Holt with Stein Wood and Havant Thicket
- Bells Copse
- Outhills Copse with Stakehills Coppice and Beech Wood
- Bushy Lease with Neville's Park and Littlepark Wood
- The Queen's Inclosure in Waterlooville
- Newlandsmoor Coppice with Malin's Coppice, Drivett's Coppice, Portland Coppice, Potwall Coppice, Broomground Coppice and Greathunt Coppice
- Dunsland Coppice with Wards Coppice and Fareham Garden (wood adjoining above group)
- Sawyer's Wood
- Creech Woods
- Place Wood
- Mitchelland Copse
- Stroud Coppice
- Hipley Copse
- Waltonheath Plantation with Ashlands Plantation and Staplecross Copse
- Goathouse Copse with Russell Copse and Kiln Wood
- Grub Coppice with Mill Coppice
- West Walk (one of the largest woods) (with Lowerfield Copse and Upperfield Copse)
- Dirty Copse with Great Holywell Copse
- Mill Copse with Hoegate Commons, The Purlieu and Huntbourn Wood
- Orchard Copse with Birching Copse
- Close Wood and Bishop's Wood
- Shaftesbury Copse, Aylesbury Copse with Ravens Wood, Birchfield Copse, Dash Wood, Dandy Copse and Fiddlers Green
- Mushes Coppice with Everitts Coppice, Stonyfield Copse, Flagpond Copse, Sager's Moor, Dimmock's Moor, Ridge Copse, Blackmoor Copse, Waterclose Copse and Sawpit Copse
- Brook Wood with Horse Wood, Hallwood Copse, Mansfield High Wood, Hole Copse and Silford Copse
- Jacob's Croft, Hangman's Copse, Blacklands Copse, Birch Row, Alder Moor, Maids' Garden Copse and Botley Row (wood that adjoins above group)
- Gull Coppice and Bushy Land, in Swanwick
- Wellspring Copse with Swanwick Wood
- Manor Farm Country Park with Dock Copse, Catiland Copse, Vantage Copse and Durncombe's Copse
- Netley Common with Dumbleton's Copse
- Telegraph Woods with Beacon Hill Woodland Park
- Hog Wood with Milkmeads Copse, Vocus Copse, High Wood and/in Itchen Valley Country Park
- Home Wood with Smithys Wood, Cox's Rough, Hut Wood, Marshall's Rows, Spring Copse and Chilworth Common
- Otterbourne Park Wood and Pitmore Copse
- Home Copse, Long Copse and Rownhams Plantation
- The woods that cover most of Cranbury Park
- Windmill Copse
- Hocombe Plantation with Trodds Copse
- Broadgate Plantation
- Ampfield Wood with Neville's Copse, Amprield Plantation and Hursley Forest
