= Guard ship =

Type of naval vessel

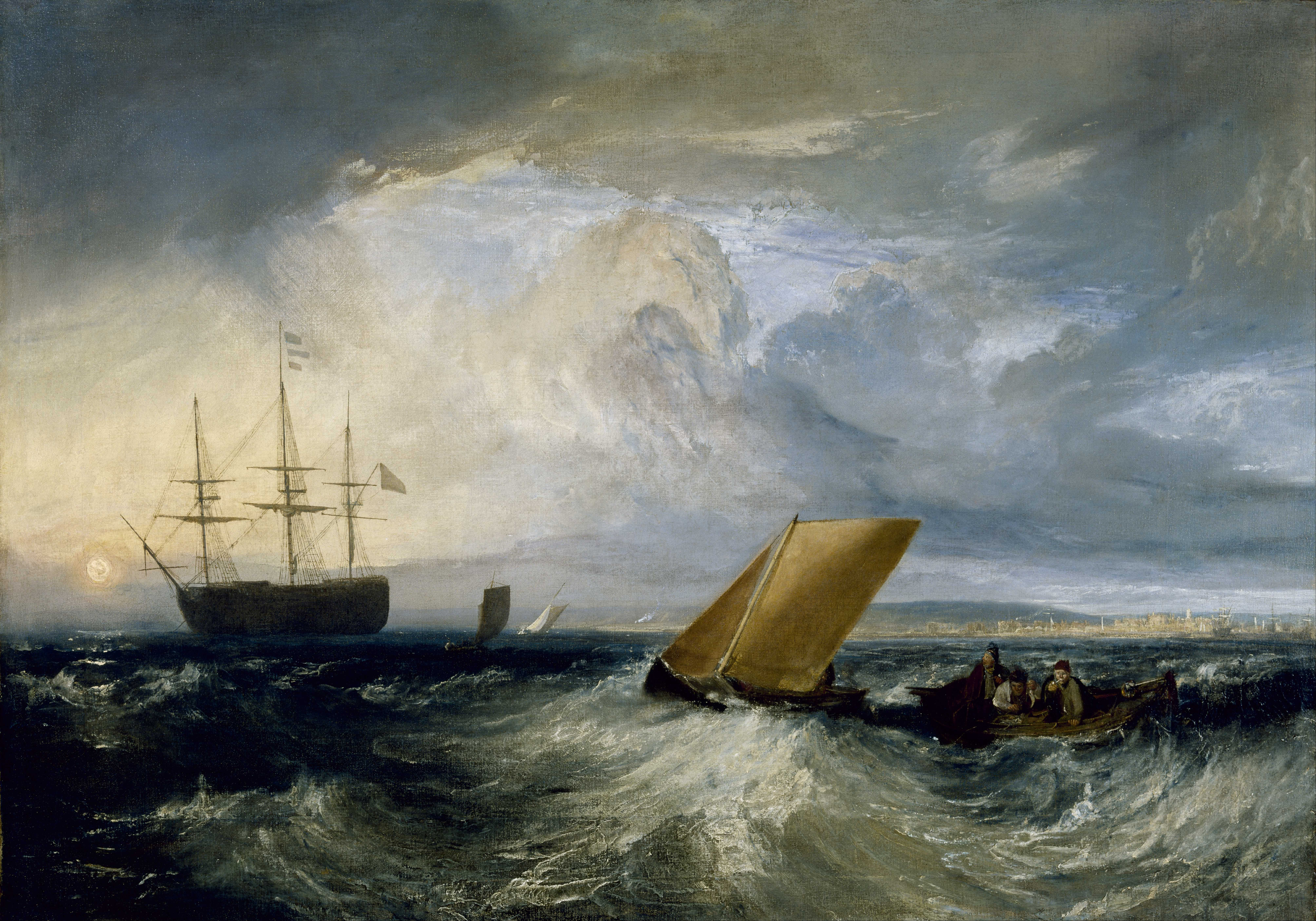
1808 painting of a British guard ship in the River Thames

A guard ship is a warship assigned as a stationary guard in a port or harbour, as opposed to a coastal patrol boat, which serves its protective role at sea.

== Royal Navy ==
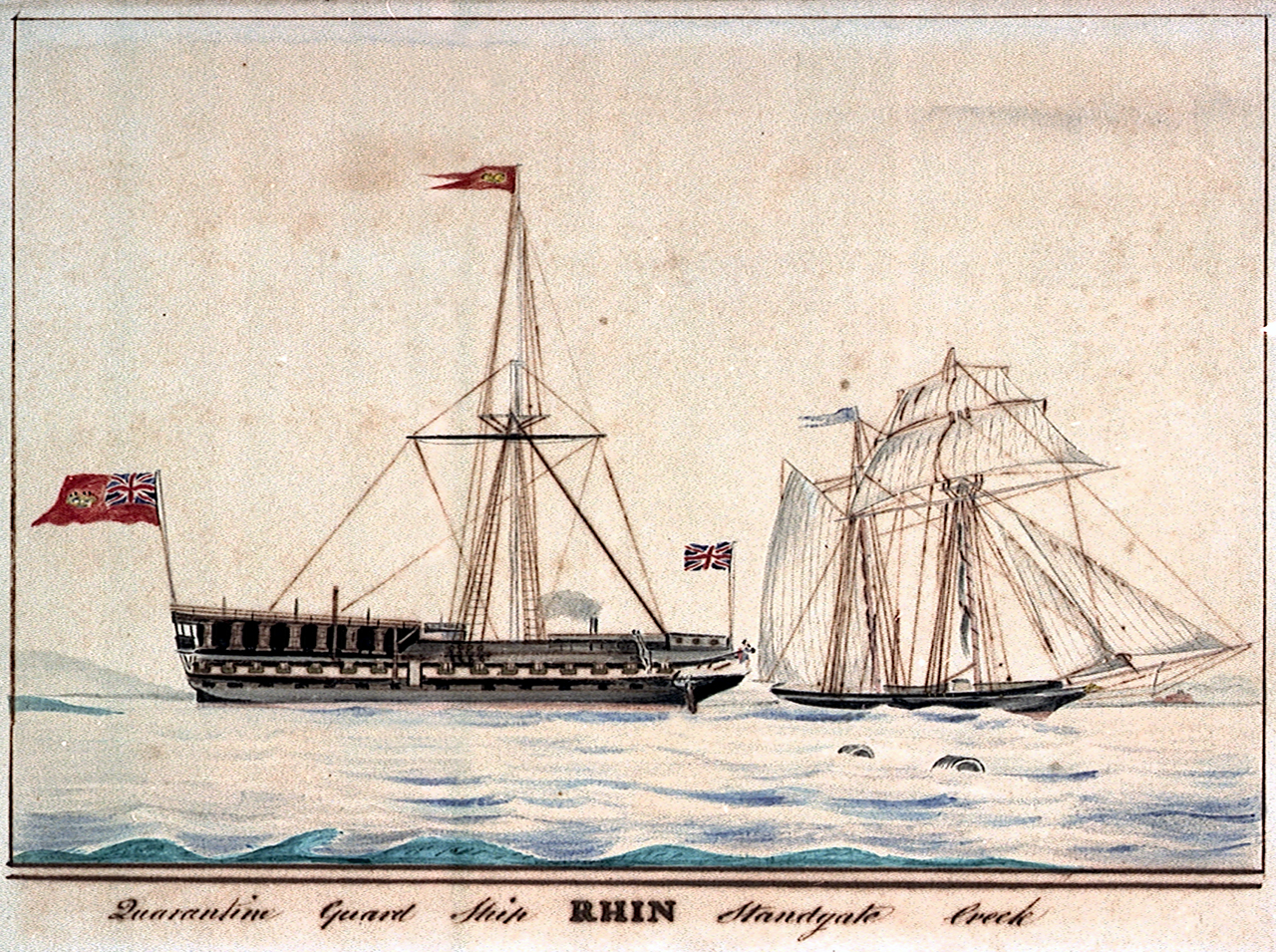
19th-century illustration of the quarantine guard ship Rhin off Sheerness

In the Royal Navy of the eighteenth century, peacetime guard ships were usually third-rate or fourth-rate ships of the line. The larger ships in the fleet would be laid up "in ordinary" with skeleton crews, the spars, sails and rigging removed and the decks covered by canvas – the historic equivalent of a reserve fleet. By contrast the guard ships would carry sails and rigging aboard, be cleaned below the waterline to increase their speed under sail, and be manned by at least one quarter of their normal crew.

A port or major waterway may be assigned a single guardship which would also serve as the naval headquarters for the area. Multiple guardships were required at larger ports and Royal Dockyards, with the largest single vessel routinely serving as the Port Admiral's flagship.

If war was declared, or an enemy fleet was sighted, the guard ships could become fully manned and ready for sea in a matter of hours or days, as opposed to the months it could take to recommission a ship "in ordinary". This was of greatest utility to the British prior to the outbreak of the War of Jenkins' Ear against Spain. On 10 July, 1739 King George II authorised preparations for a maritime assault on Spanish colonies. For this purpose, Admiral Edward Vernon was able to assemble a fleet of eight fully armed and provisioned guardships within ten days of the Royal Command. The fleet was so quickly assembled that it reached the Spanish West Indies on 22 October, one day before war was formally declared.

However, in the modern age, recently the Royal Navy has deployed many ships to guard the Falkland Islands from the threat of Argentine invasion, HMS Clyde guarded the islands for her whole active service life, replaced by HMS Forth in 2020, a role she holds to this day.

== Russian and Soviet Navies ==
In Russian nomenclature, the term storozhevoy korabl' (or storozhevoj korabl'; Russian: сторожевой корабль, lit. 'guard ship') indicates a general-purpose patrol and/or escort vessel with a displacement of 600–4,000 tonnes (590–3,940 long tons; 660–4,410 short tons). In addition, similar-purpose vessels with a displacement of up to 150 tonnes (150 long tons; 170 short tons) are classified as the storozhevoy kater (Russian: сторожевой катер, lit. 'guard boat'). The guard ship type, which was introduced during World War I, is comparable to a frigate, corvette, or patrol ship, depending on its size and armament.

The operational role of Soviet guard ships, however, differed significantly from that of Western frigates and corvettes, which were primarily escort ships. Actually, the Soviet guard ships were intended to patrol or guard an area. They could act as escorts, but lacked the endurance and some capabilities (e.g., helicopters) typical of Western escort vessels.

The English term guard ship is the closest functional equivalent to the Russian naval term brandvakhtenny korabl' (Russian: брандвахтенный корабль, lit. 'fire-watch ship') or brandvakhta (Russian: брандвахта), which was borrowed from the Dutch word brandwacht (lit. 'fire watch').

== Other uses ==
A guard boat is a boat which goes the round of a fleet at anchor to see that due watch is kept at night.

== See also ==
- Plane guard

== Bibliography ==
- Baugh, Daniel A. (1965). British Naval Administration in the Age of Walpole. Princeton University Press. ISBN 9780691624297.
- Mackay, Ruddock F. (1965). Admiral Hawke. Oxford University Press. OCLC 398581.
