= Portrait of Talleyrand (Scheffer) =

Painting by Ary Scheffer

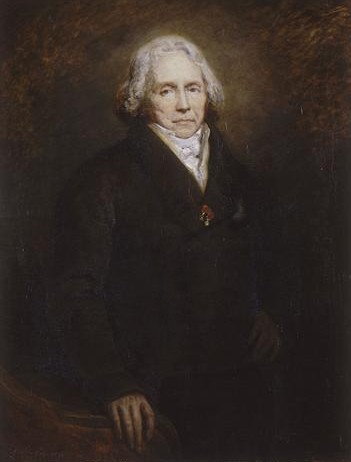
- Artist: Ary Scheffer
- Year: 1828
- Type: Oil on canvas, portrait painting
- Dimensions: 116 cm × 90 cm (46 in × 35 in)
- Location: Musée Condé, Chantilly

Portrait of Talleyrand is an oil on canvas portrait painting by the Dutch artist Ary Scheffer, from 1828. It is held at the Musée Condé, in Chantilly.

== History and description ==
It depicts the French statesman Charles Maurice de Talleyrand-Périgord, who famously served as French Foreign Minister during the Napoleonic era. It shows him at the age of seventy four. Scheffer was a Dutch artist associated with the Romantic movement who settled in Paris and enjoyed success with portraits and history paintings

Two years later the veteran Talleyrand was sent as Ambassador to London by the new July Monarchy, in 1830. The painting was acquired by Talleyrand's close friend, the English Whig politician Henry Vassall-Fox, 3rd Baron Holland. It later passed into the hands of Prince Henri, Duke of Aumale. Today it is part of the collection of the Musée Condé, in Chantilly.

Due to Talleyrand's notability in Britain, a mezzotint was produced by the engraver Thomas Hodgetts in 1834.

== See also ==
- Portrait of Talleyrand, an 1808 painting by François Gérard

== Bibliography ==
- Garnier-Pelle, Nicole. The Condé Museum at the Château de Chantilly. Flammarion, 2009.
- Harris, Robin. Talleyrand: Betrayer and Saviour of France. John Murray, 2007.
- Kelly, Linda. Talleyrand in London: The Master Diplomat's Last Mission. Bloomsbury Publishing, 2017.
