= François-Xavier Fabre =

French painter (1766–1837)

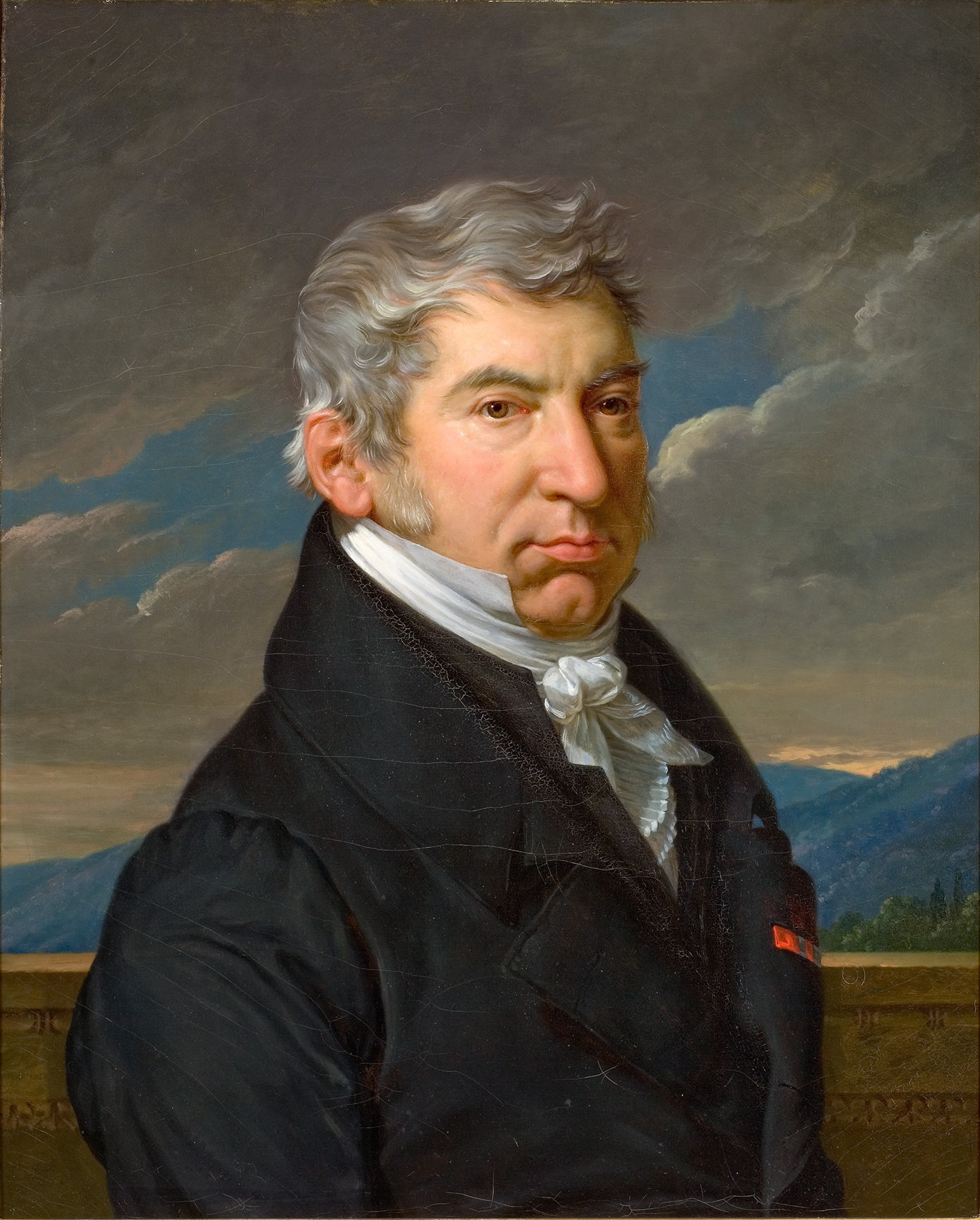
- Self-portrait, 1835
- Born: 1 April 1766; Montpellier, France
- Died: 16 March 1837 (aged 70); Montpellier, France
- Known for: Painting

François-Xavier Fabre (French pronunciation: [fʁɑ̃swa ɡzavje fabʁ]; 1 April 1766 – 16 March 1837) was a French painter of historical subjects.

== Biography ==
Born in Montpellier, Fabre was a pupil of Jacques-Louis David, and made his name by winning the Prix de Rome in 1787.

During the French Revolution, Fabre went to live in Florence, becoming a member of the Florentine Academy, where he taught painting. The friends he made in Italy included the dramatist, Vittorio Alfieri, whose widow, Princess Louise of Stolberg-Gedern, Countess of Albany, he is said to have married. On Louise's death in 1824, he inherited her fortune, which he used to found an art school in his home town. On his own death, he bequeathed his own art collection to the town, forming the basis of the Musée Fabre.

Fabre began his training in Montpellier's art academy, where he spent several years prior to joining Jacques-Louis David's studio in Paris. His studies were paid for by the financier and art collector, Philippe-Laurent de Joubert. Philippe-Laurent was the father of Laurent-Nicolas de Joubert. Fabre painted a portrait of Laurent-Nicolas de Joubert, which is now in the Getty Museum. Fabre gained popularity in Florence. The city's Italian aristocrats and tourists were drawn to his elegance, realism, and precision of his portraits. This popularity earned Fabre a place in the Florentine Academy. He became an art teacher, art collector, and art dealer in Florence.

Fabre's works include The Dying Saint Sebastian (1789), The Judgment of Paris (1808), and The Death of Narcissus (1814).

Among his pupils in Florence was Emilio Santarelli.

== Notable works ==
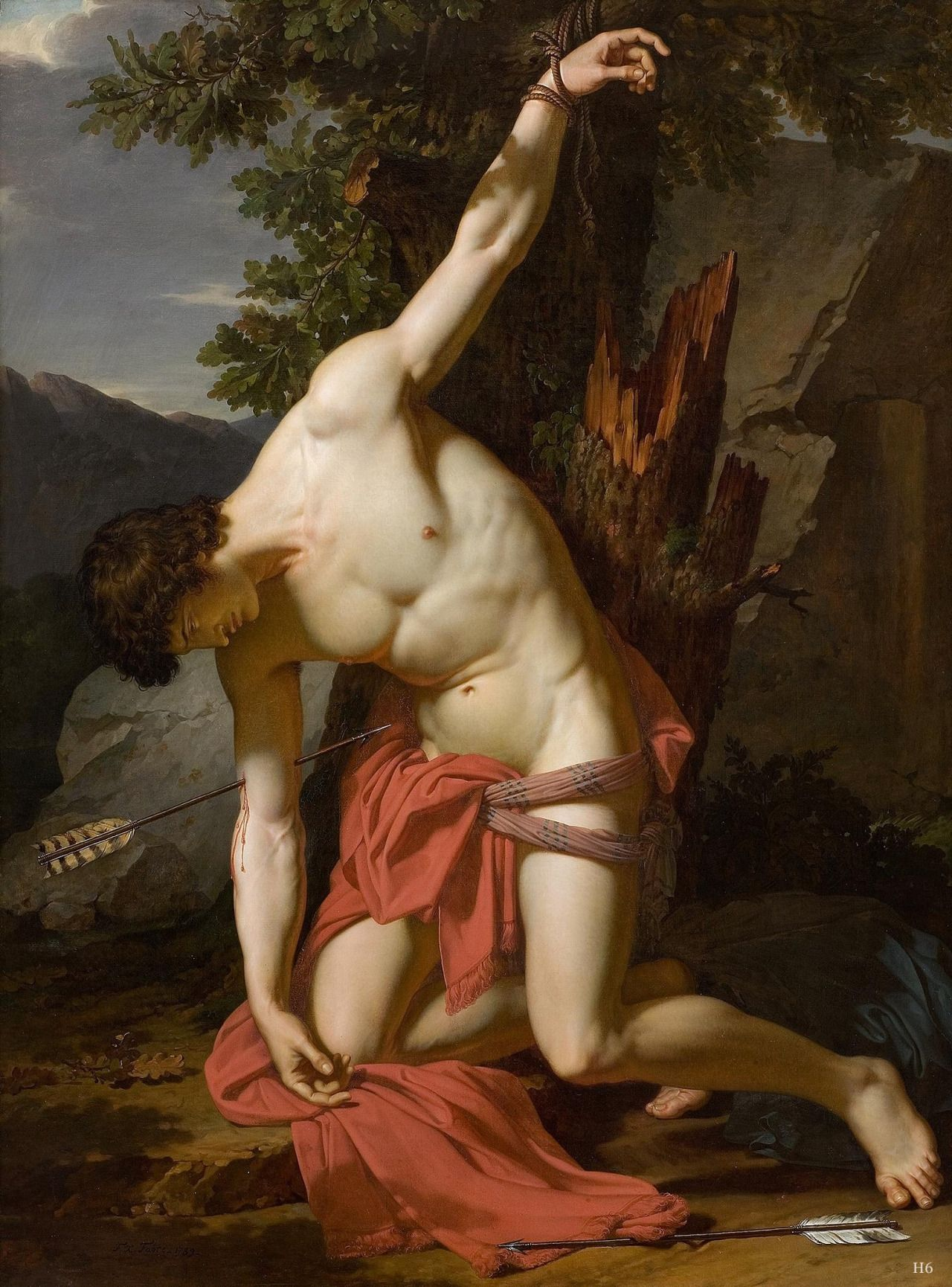
The Dying Saint Sebastian, 1789

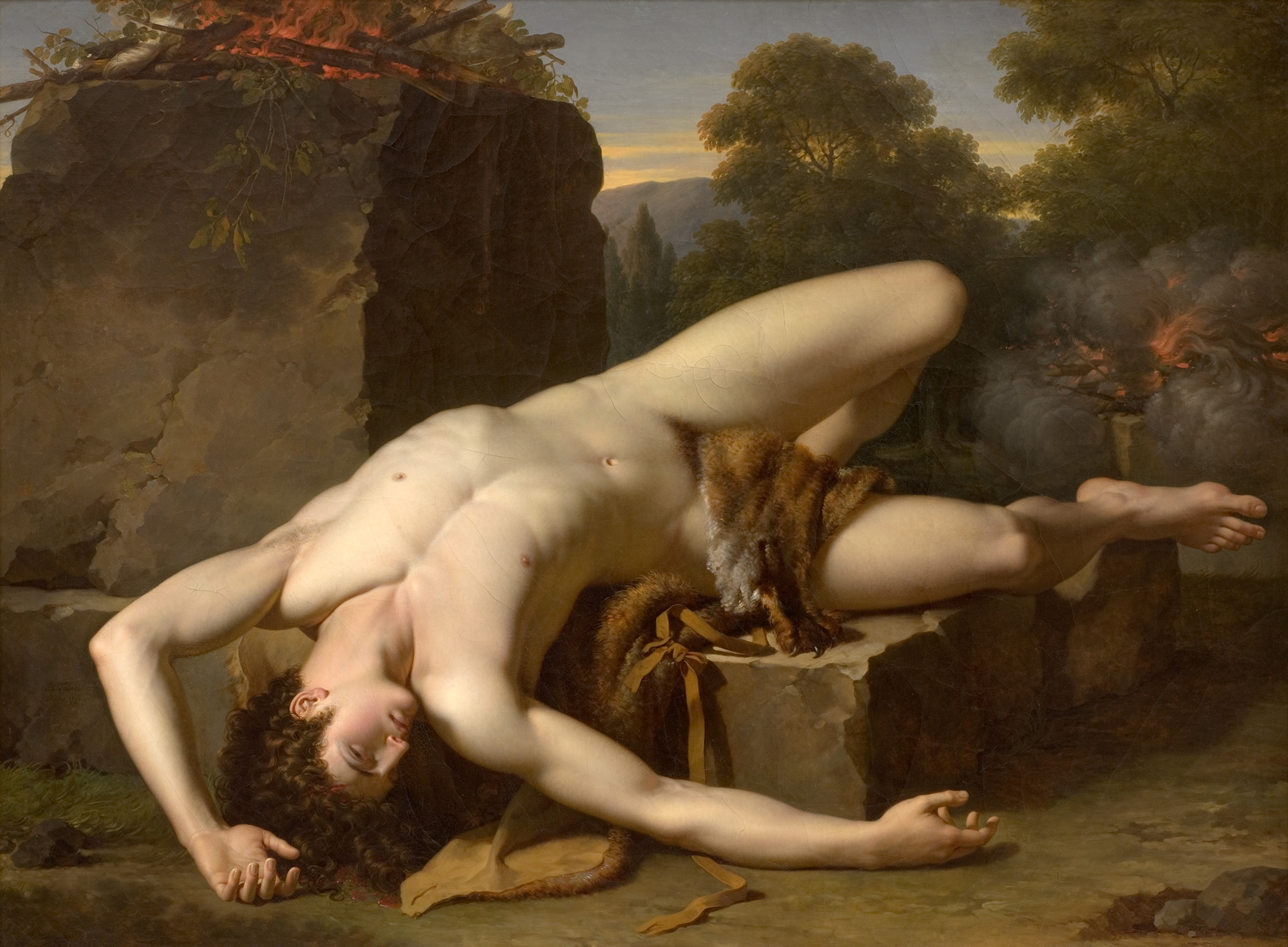
The Death of Abel, 1790

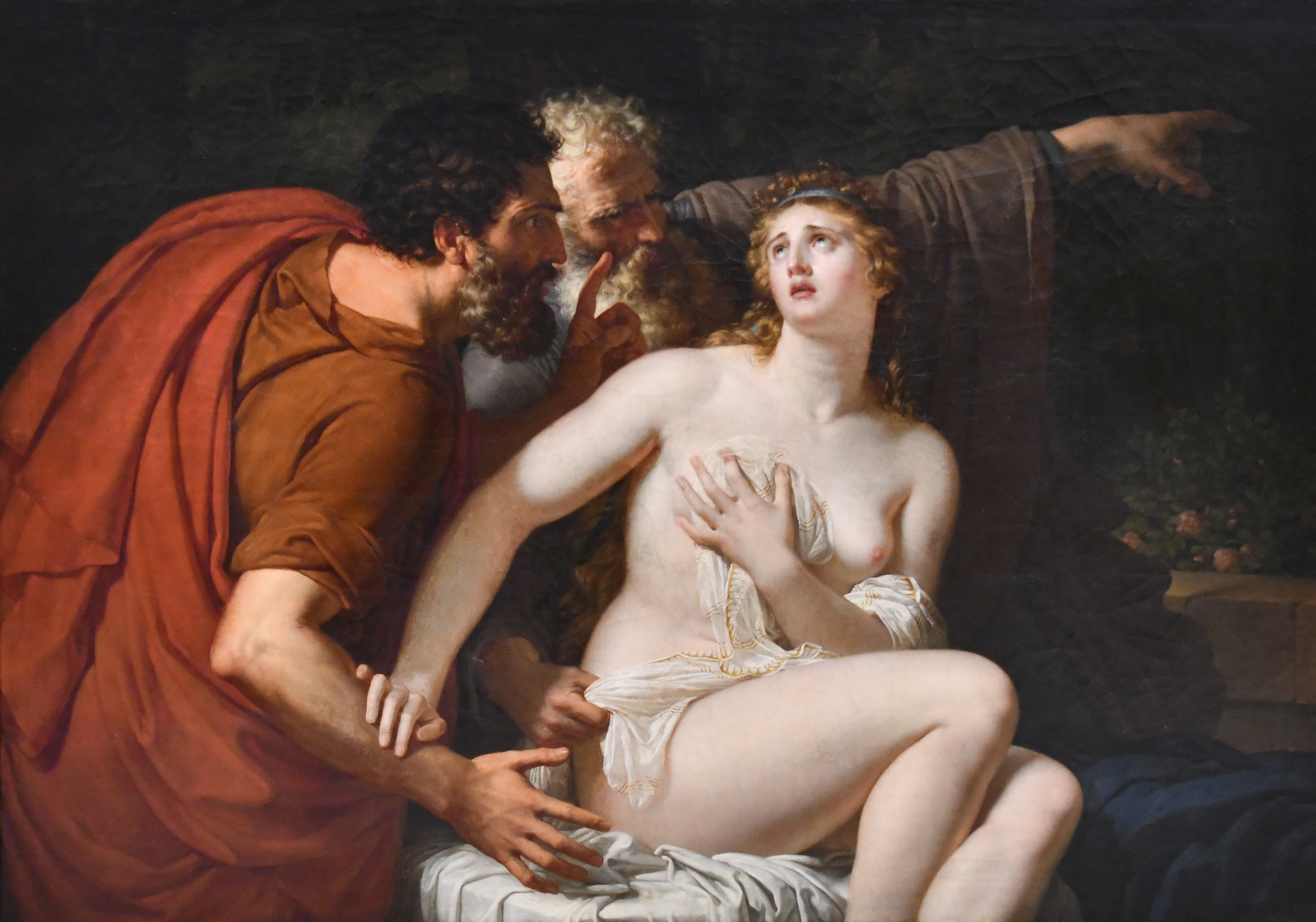
Suzanne and the Elders, 1791

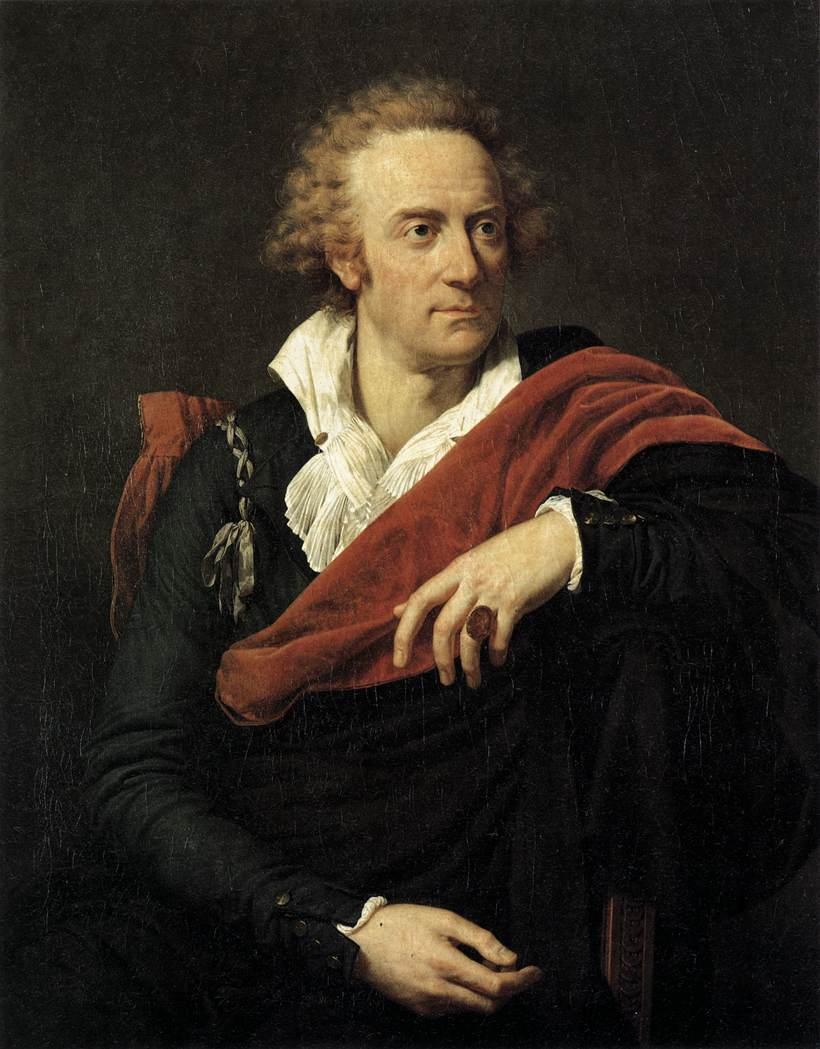
Portrait of Vittorio Alfieri, 1793

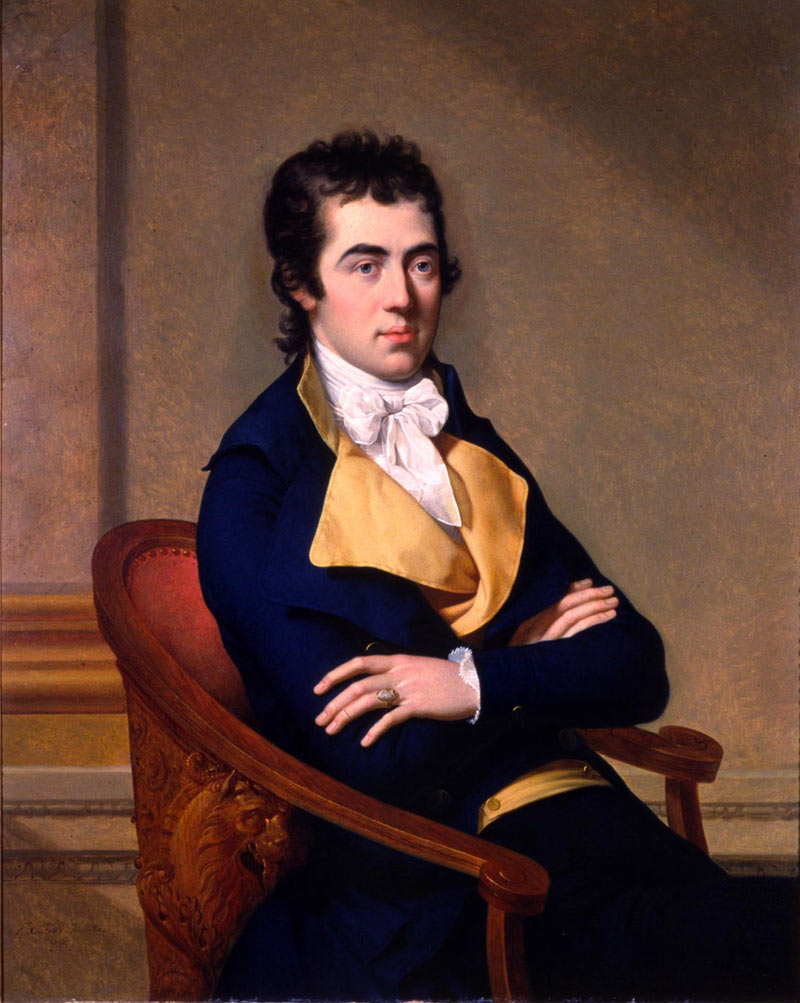
Portrait of Henry Vassall-Fox, Lord Holland, 1795

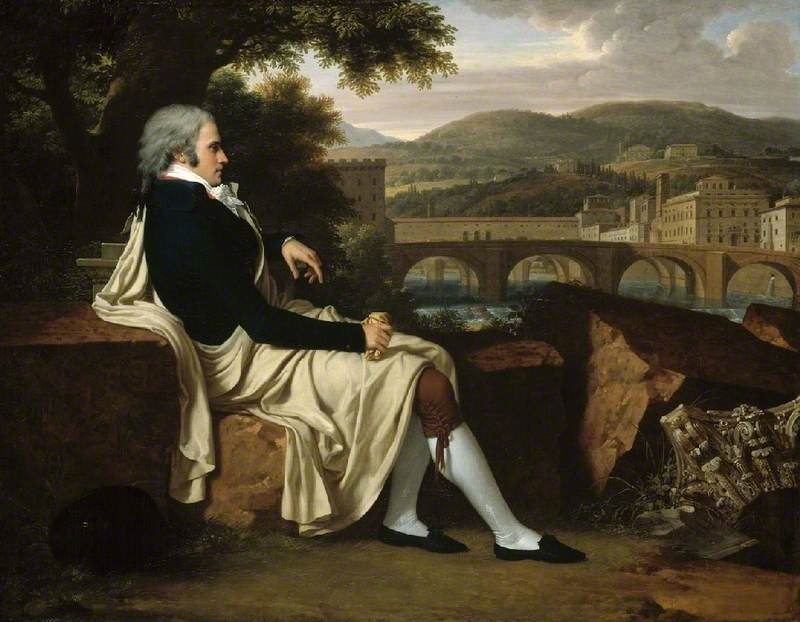
Allen Smith Contemplating Across the Arno, 1797

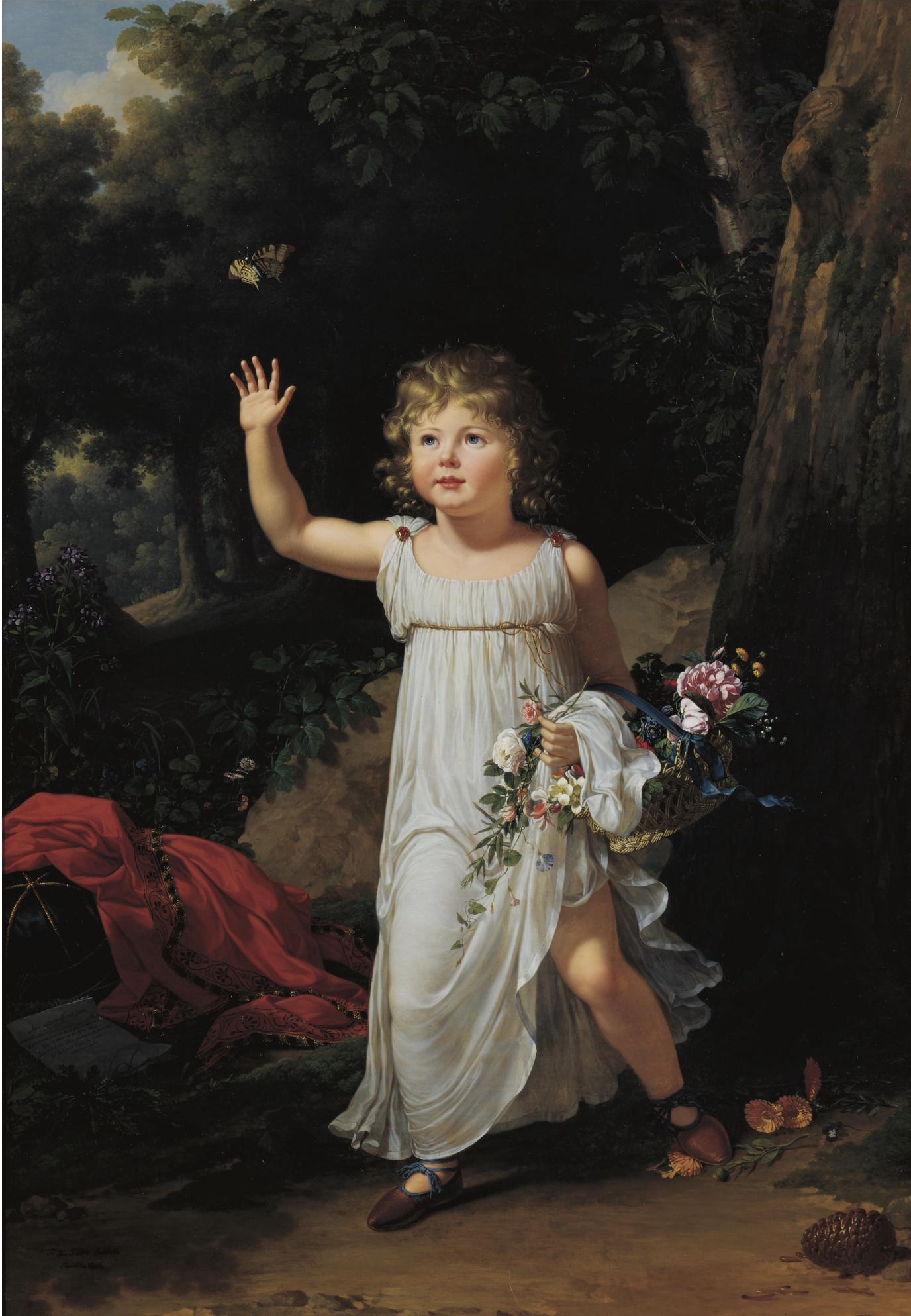
Portrait of Edgar Clarke, 1802

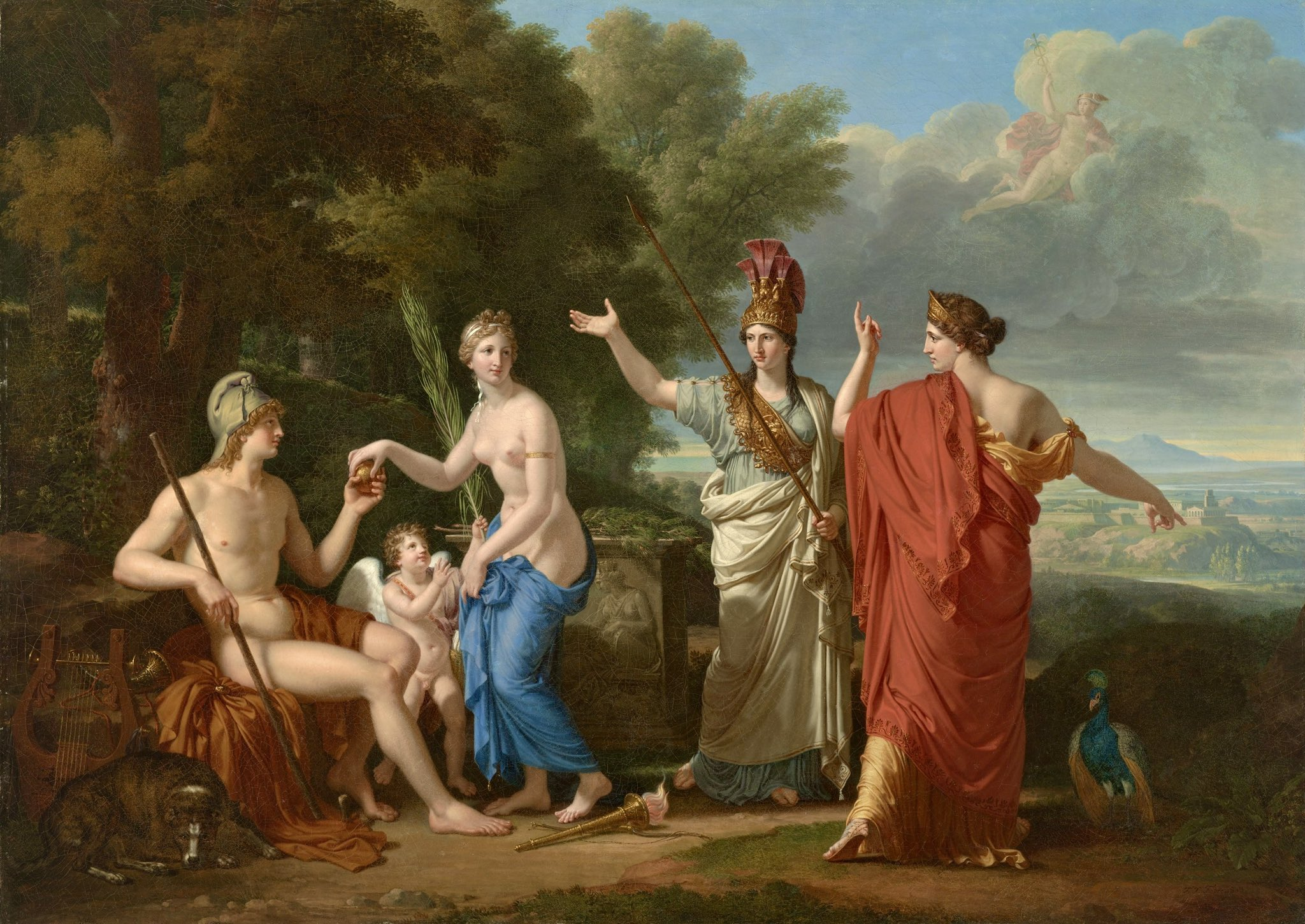
The Judgment of Paris, 1808

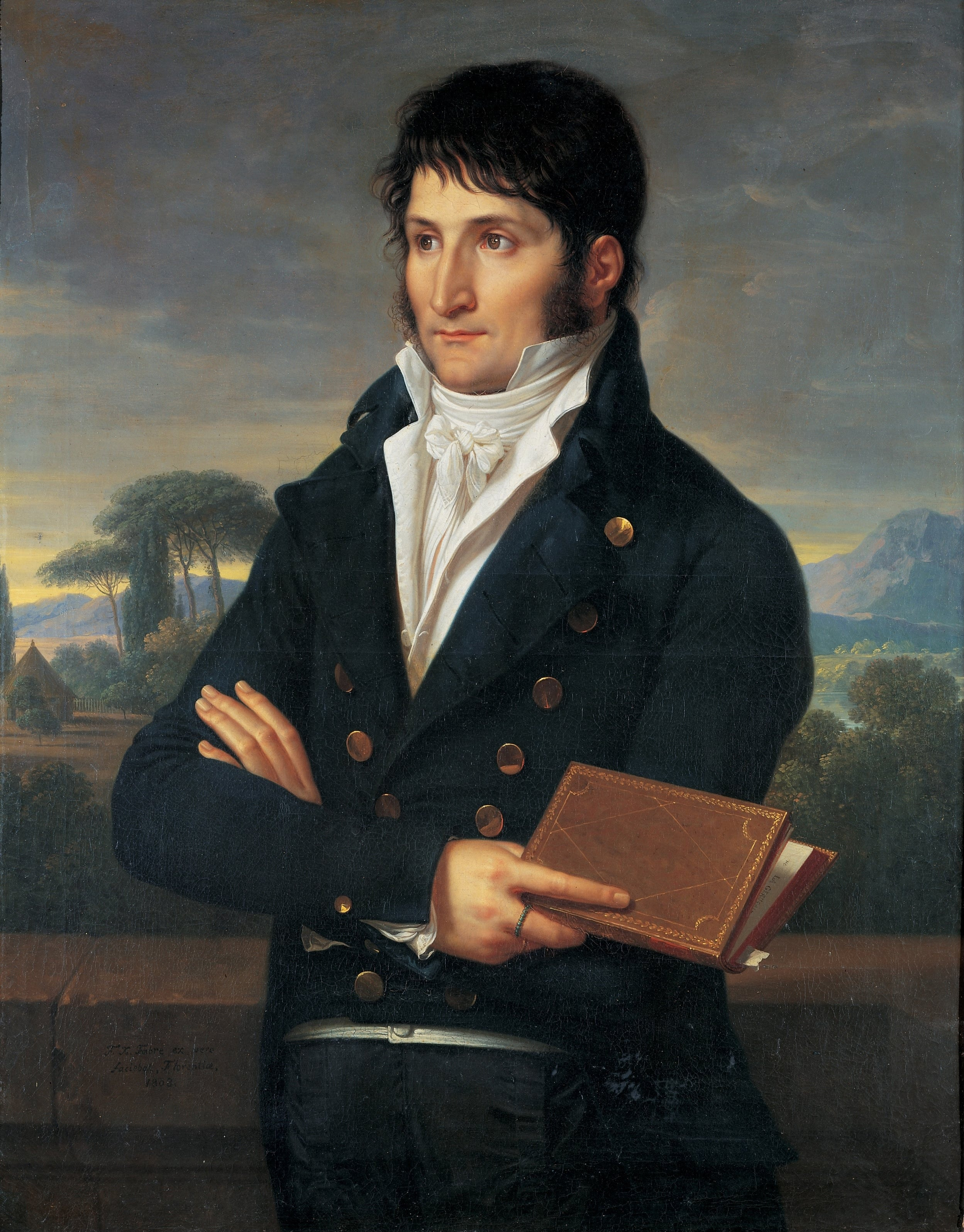
Lucien Bonaparte at the Villa Rufinella, 1808

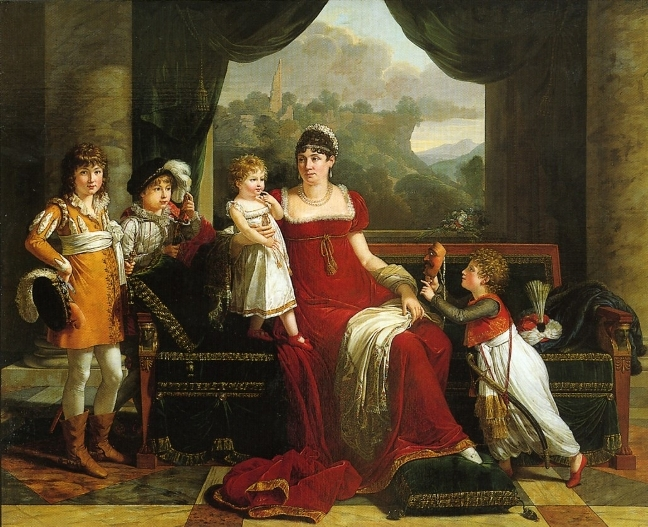
Portrait of Mrs Clarke with her Four Children, 1810

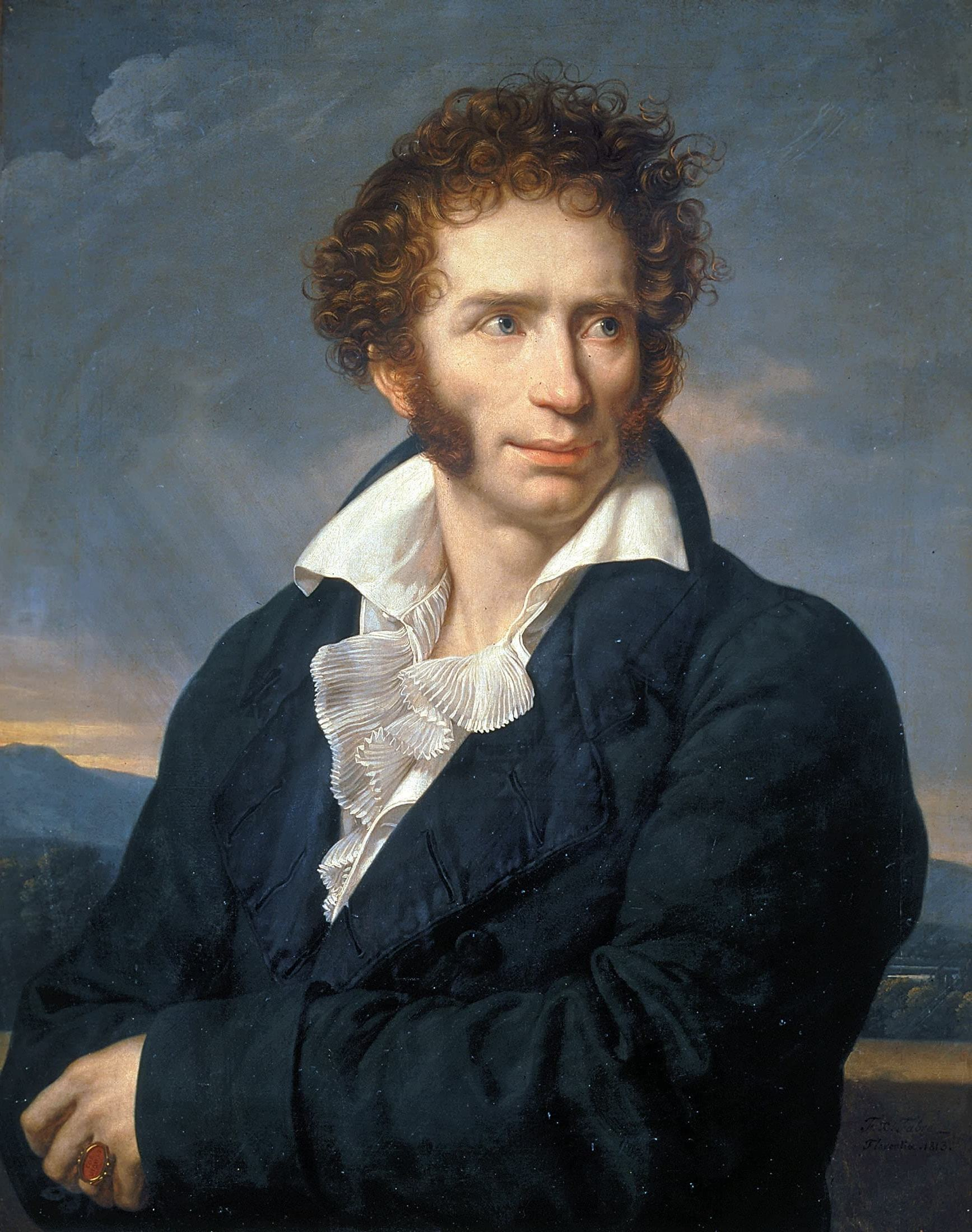
Portrait of Ugo Foscolo, 1813

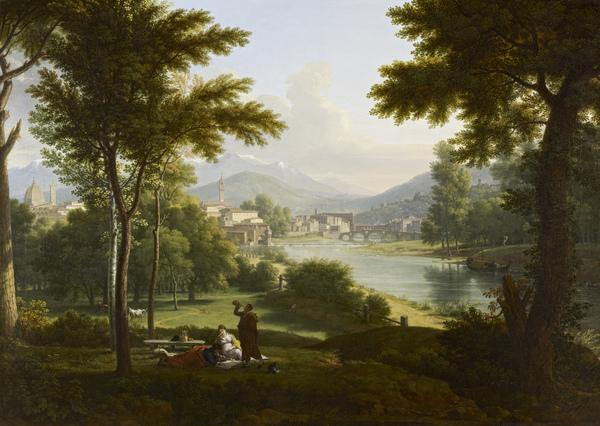
A View of Florence from the North Bank of the Arno, 1813

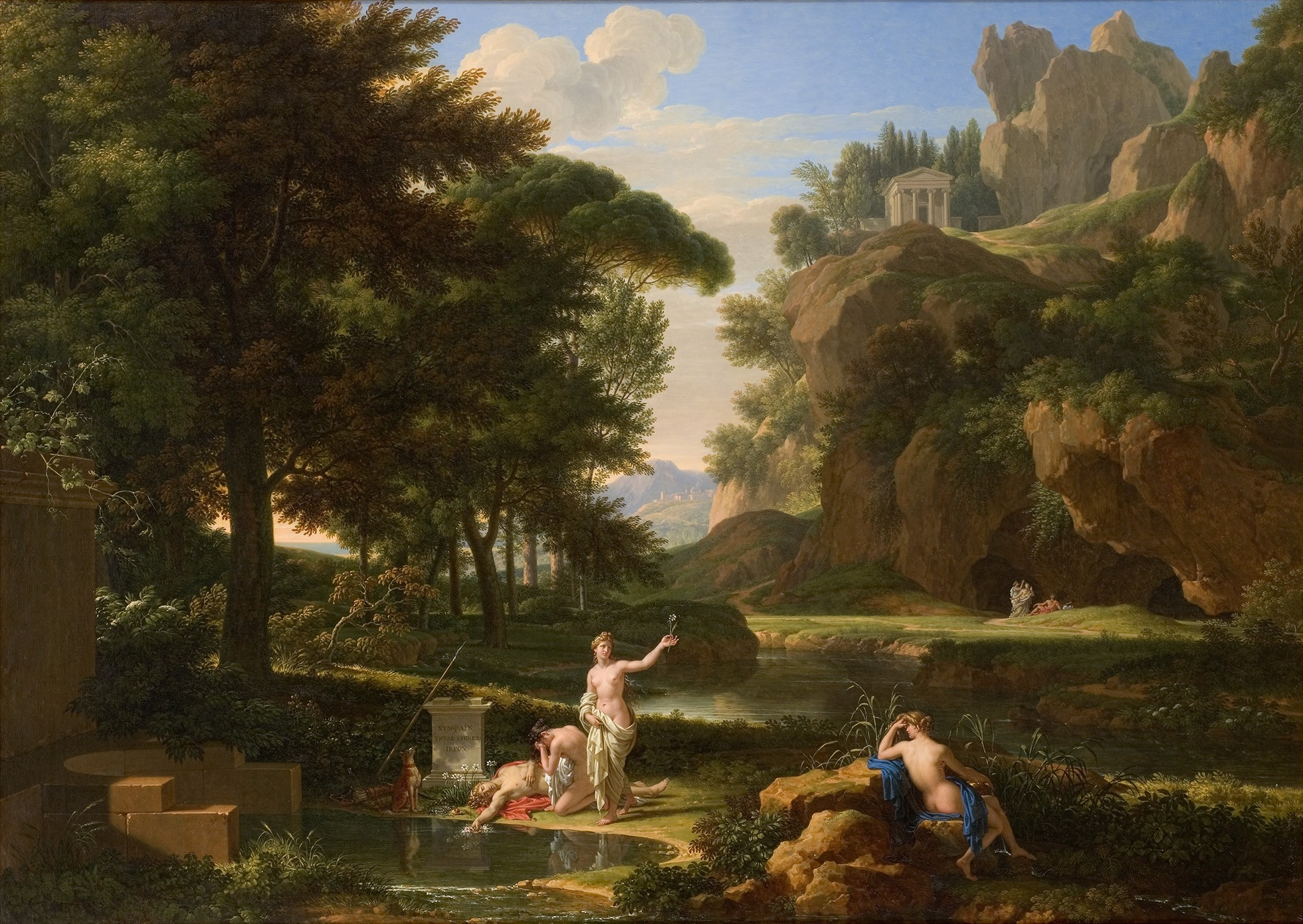
The Death of Narcissus, 1814

== Sources ==
- Pellicer, Laure (2003). "Fabre, François-Xavier, Baron". Grove Art Online.
