= The Spanish Bullfight =

Print by James Gillray

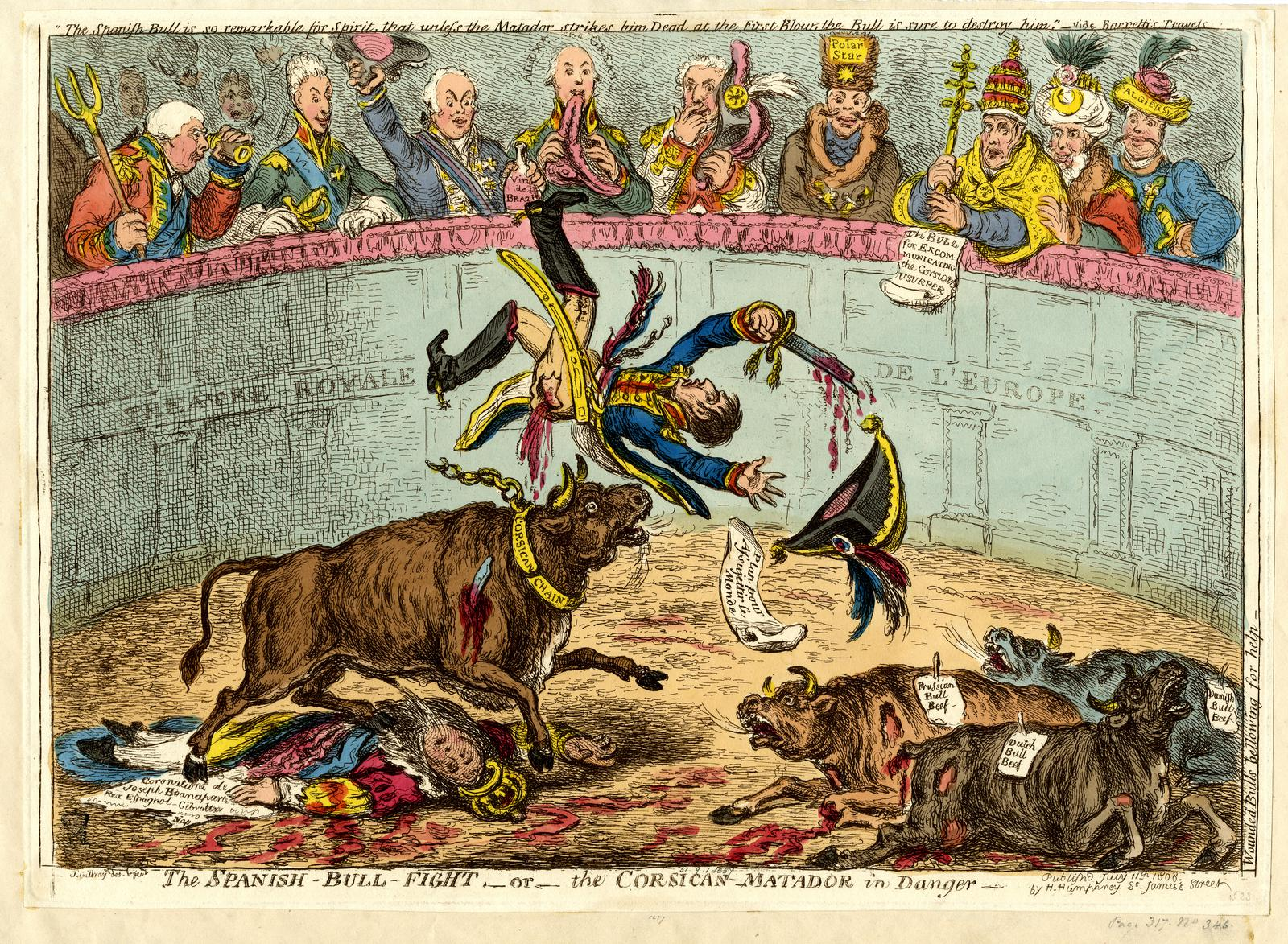
- Artist: James Gillray
- Year: 11 July 1808
- Type: Hand-coloured etching
- Dimensions: 23.3 cm × 35.5 cm (9.2 in × 14.0 in)
- Location: British Museum; London

The Spanish Bullfight is an 1808 satirical cartoon by the British caricaturist James Gillray which presents the ongoing Napoleonic Wars as a bullfight. It was inspired by the Dos de Mayo Uprising in Madrid and other uprisings across Spain against French occupation which triggered the Peninsular War. Spain, previously an enemy of Britain, rapidly became an ally. It is known with the subtitle The Corsican Matador in Danger.

The Corsican-born French emperor Napoleon is depicted as a matador being tossed by a bull representing the Kingdom of Spain. His brother Joseph I, who had replaced the deposed Charles IV, has already been gored by the bull. On the right of the image three bulls, previously wounded by the matadors, are marked as Denmark, Dutch and Prussian animals. The Bullring in which the spectacle takes place is named the Theatre Royal, Europe. Watching with approval are various monarchs of Europe and beyond George III, Francis I of Austria, John, Regent of Portugal, Alexander I of Russia, Gustav IV of Sweden, Pope Pius VII, Mustafa IV of the Ottoman Empire and Frederick William III of Prussia.

Its identification of the Spanish nation with a bull may have been an inspiration for La Tauromaquia Francisco Goya's later series of prints. The print was published by Hannah Humphrey who distributed much of Gillray's output. Copies of the work exist at a variety of locations including the British Museum and the National Portrait Gallery.

== Bibliography ==
- Israel, Jonathan. The Expanding Blaze: How the American Revolution Ignited the World, 1775-1848. Princeton University Press, 2017.
- Tomlinson, Janis. Goya: A Portrait of the Artist. Princeton University Press, 2020.
- Wright, Thomas. The Works of James Gillray the Caricaturist. 1873.
