= The Forest of Bere =

Painting by J. M. W. Turner

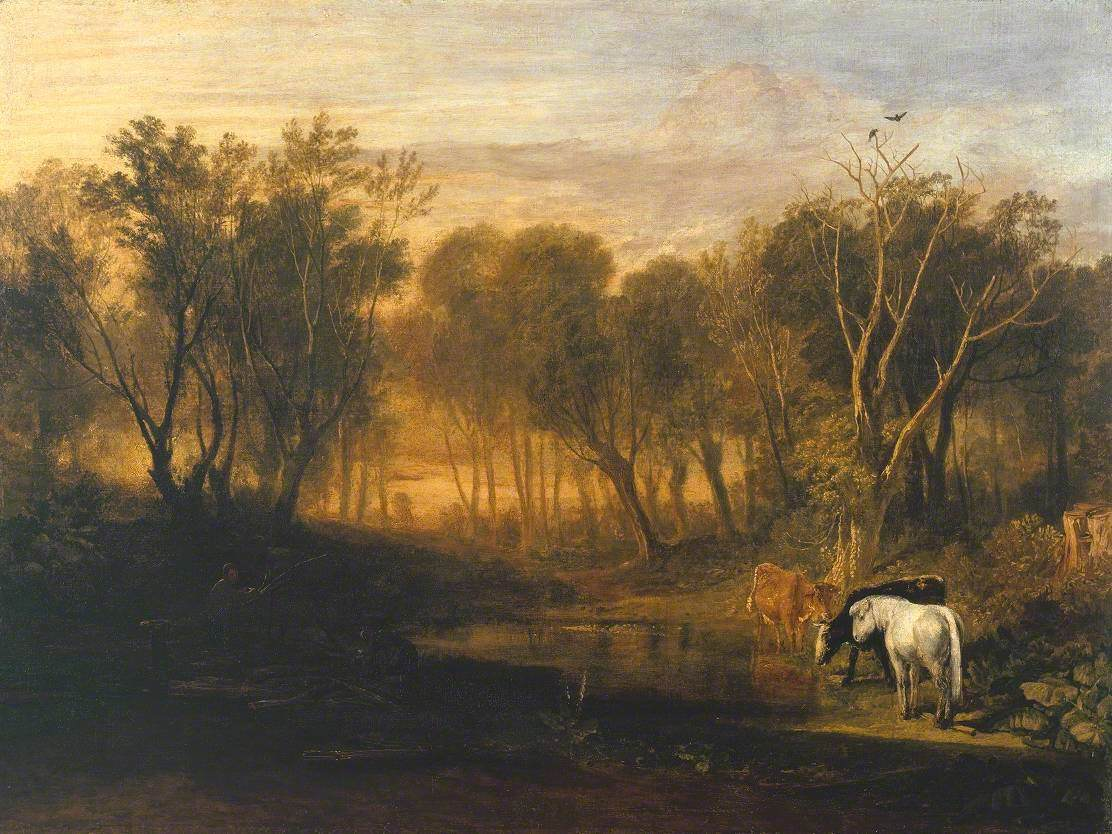
- Artist: J. M. W. Turner
- Year: 1808
- Type: Oil on canvas, landscape painting
- Dimensions: 89 cm × 119.4 cm (35 in × 47.0 in)
- Location: Petworth House; Sussex

The Forest of Bere is an 1808 landscape painting by the British artist J.M.W. Turner. It depicts a view of the Forest of Bere in Hampshire. Turner travelled through the area on his way to Portsmouth to view the Danish fleet being brought into harbour following the Bombardment of Copenhagen in 1807, which resulted in his seascape Two Captured Danish Ships Entering Portsmouth Harbour.

Rather than display the work at the Royal Academy's Summer Exhibition Turner exhibited at his own studio in Queen Anne Street in Marylebone. It was purchased there by the art collector George Wyndham, 3rd Earl of Egremont, who acquired a number of Turner paintings for his country estate Petworth House in Sussex. In 1984 the painting was accepted in lieu by the British government. While formally allocated to the Tate Britain, they remain in situ at Petworth.

== See also ==
- List of paintings by J. M. W. Turner

== Bibliography ==
- Bailey, Anthony. J.M.W. Turner: Standing in the Sun. Tate Enterprises, 2013.
- Rowell, Christopher, Warrell, Ian & Brown, David Blayney. Turner at Petworth. Harry N. Abrams, 2002.
- Solkin, David. Turner and the Masters. Harry N. Abrams, 2009.
