= Portrait of Talleyrand =

Painting by François Gérard

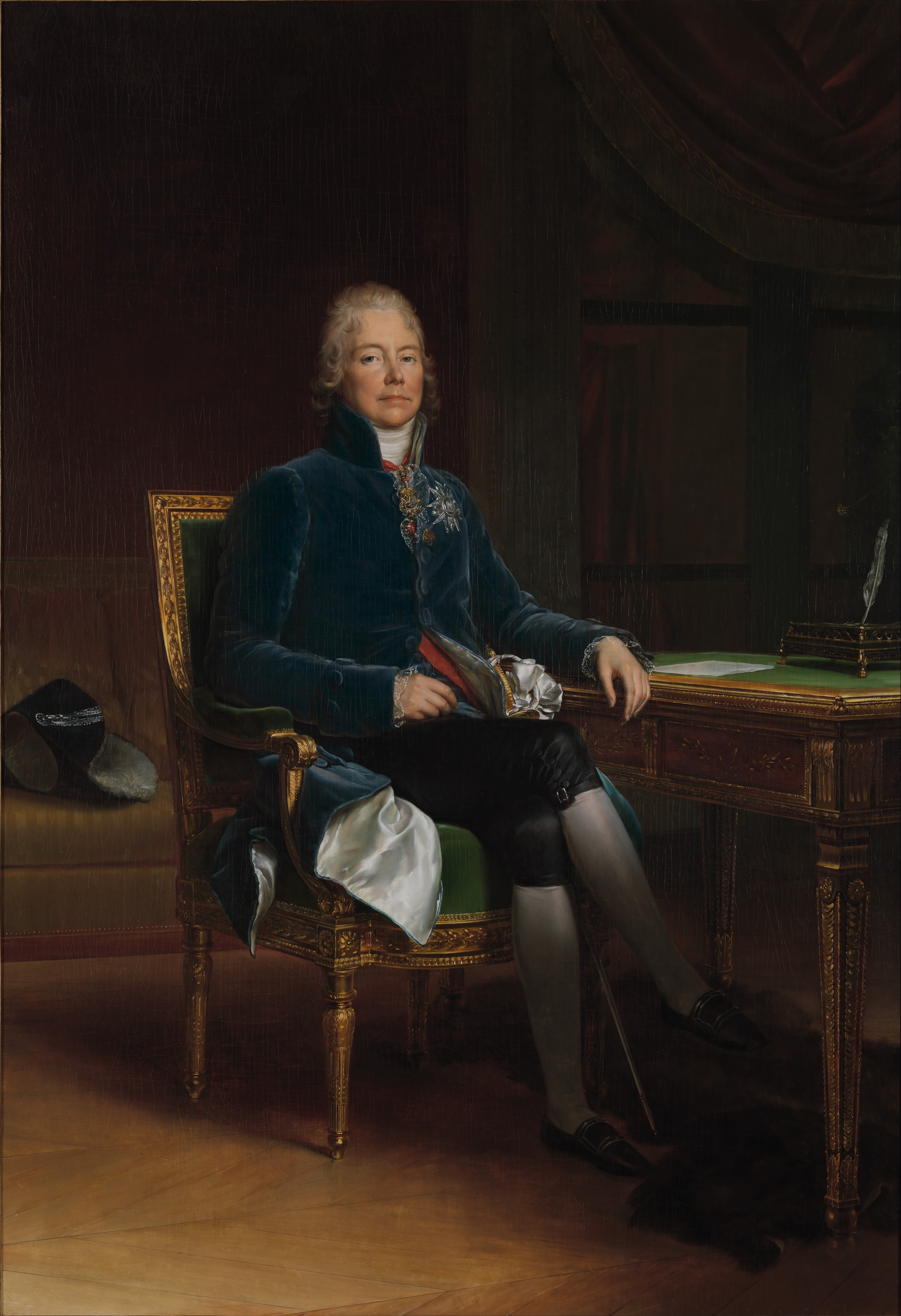
- Artist: François Gérard
- Year: 1808
- Type: Oil on canvas, portrait painting
- Dimensions: 213 cm × 147 cm (84 in × 58 in)
- Location: Metropolitan Museum of Art; New York

Portrait of Talleyrand is an 1808 portrait painting by the artist François Gérard of the French statesman Charles Maurice de Talleyrand-Périgord. It is held in the Metropolitan Museum of Art, in New York.

== History and description ==
It was commissioned by Talleyrand shortly after he had resigned as French Foreign Minister following a disagreement with the emperor Napoleon over policy towards France's European rivals, particularly Russia. Talleyrand remained an informal advisor to Napoleon. He later briefly served as Prime Minister of France following the Bourbon Restoration.

It was one of six full-length portraits that the artist exhibited at the Paris Salon of 1808, adding fresh momentum to his career as a portraitist. Despite its elegance Talleyrand is shown informally, depicted not as a public official but as a private nobleman. As with other paintings of him throughout his life, Talleyrand's club foot is not shown. He wears the Legion of Honour presented to him by Napoleon while the Order of the Golden Fleece, which was presented to him by Ferdinand VII of Spain at the Congress of Vienna, was likely added by Gérard seven or so years after the painting was originally completed. A noted engraving was made of the portrait by Auguste Gaspard Louis Desnoyers.

A portrait by Gérard of Talleyrand's wife Catherine Grand is also in the collection of the museum.

== See also ==
- Portrait of Talleyrand, an 1828 painting by Ary Scheffer

== Bibliography ==
- Adams, Michael. Napoleon and Russia. ISBN 0826431933. A&C Black, 2014.
- Baetjer, Katharine. French Paintings in The Metropolitan Museum of Art from the Early Eighteenth Century through the Revolution. ISBN 1588396614. Metropolitan Museum of Art, 2019.
- Price, Munro. Napoleon: The End of Glory. ISBN 0199934673. Oxford University Press, 2014.
