= Prison Interior =

1793–1794 painting by Francisco Goya

- Interior de cárcel (Spanish)
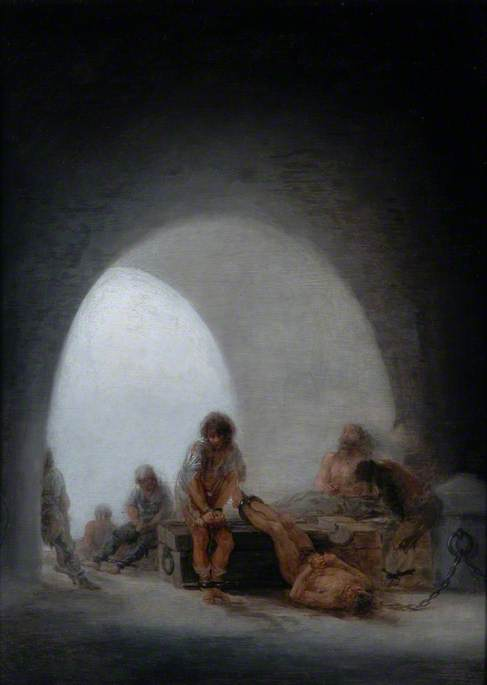
- Artist: Francisco Goya
- Year: 1793–1794
- Medium: Oil on canvas
- Dimensions: 42.9 cm × 31.7 cm (16.9 in × 12.5 in)
- Location: Bowes Museum; Barnard Castle

Prison Interior (Spanish: Interior de cárcel) is an oil-on-canvas painting completed by the Spanish artist Francisco Goya (1746–1828) between 1793 and 1794. The painting is bathed in a dim, cold light which gives it an appearance of purgatory.

It is one of a number of works the artist made of scenes set in lunatic asylums, including Yard with Lunatics (1793–1794) and The Madhouse (1812–1813). These works were painted at a time when mad-houses were "holes in the social surface, small dumps into which the psychotic could be thrown without the smallest attempt to discover, classify, or treat the nature of their illness." Goya often feared for his own sanity, a fact which underscores these works with feelings of dread.

== See also ==
- List of works by Francisco Goya

== Bibliography ==
- Connell, Evan S. Francisco Goya: A Life. New York: Counterpoint, 2004. ISBN 1-58243-307-0
- Hughes, Robert. Goya. New York: Alfred A. Knopf, 2004. ISBN 0-394-58028-1
