= Sheerness as Seen from the Nore =

Painting by J. M. W. Turner

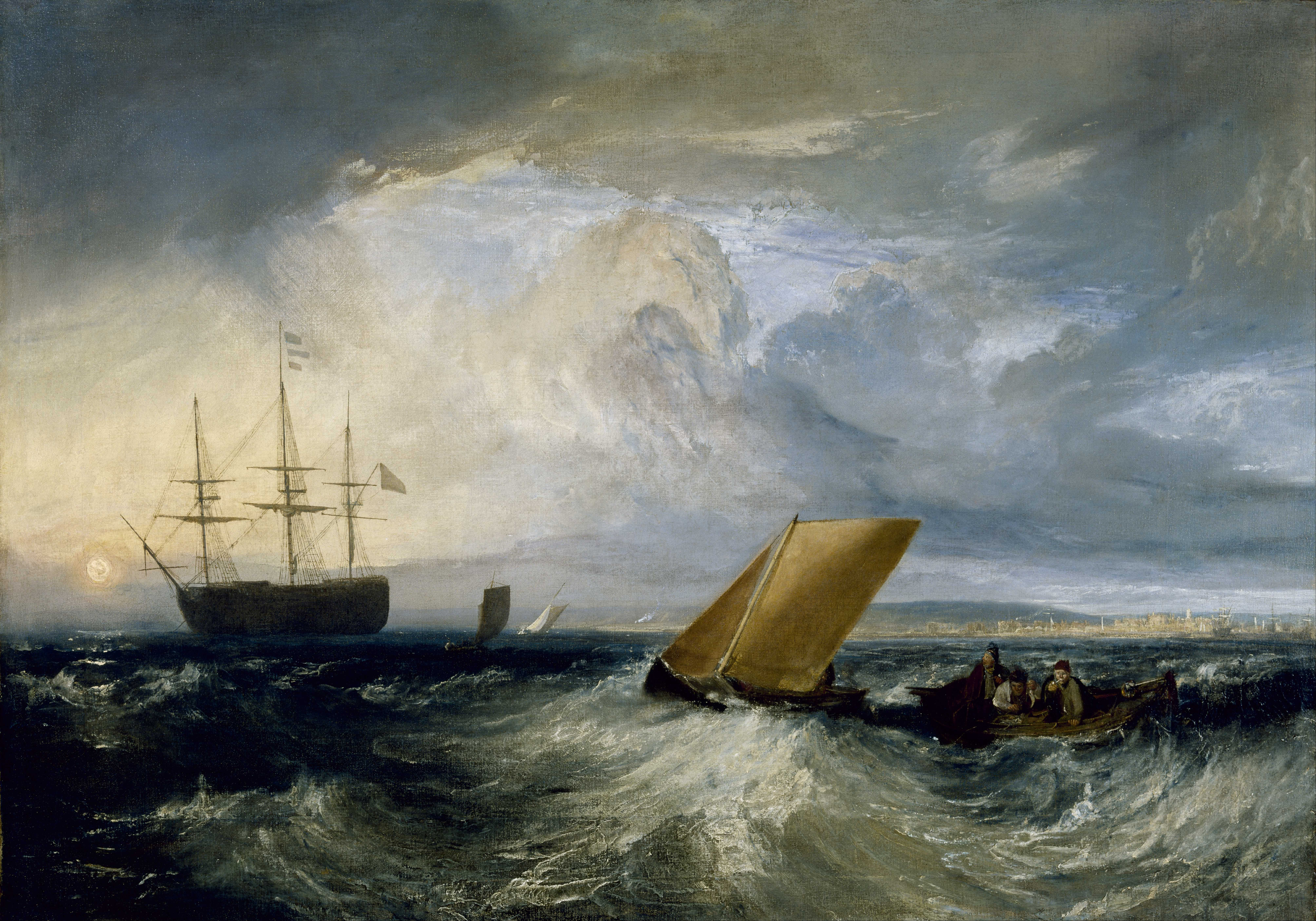
- Artist: J. M. W. Turner
- Year: 1808
- Type: Oil on canvas, landscape painting
- Dimensions: 104.5 cm × 149.6 cm (41.1 in × 58.9 in)
- Location: Museum of Fine Arts; Houston

Sheerness as Seen from the Nore is an 1808 landscape painting by the British artist J. M. W. Turner. It depicts a view looking from the Nore towards the town of Sheerness in the Thames Estuary, one of the four major Royal Navy dockyards on the river, where it joins the Medway. The Sun rising on the left creates a silhouette of the guardship in the waterway. In the foreground a group of fisherman are shown being passed by a small sailing boat. Produced at the time of the Napoleonic Wars, the warship is shown protecting the smaller vessels.

The painting was displayed in Turner's own gallery in Queen Anne Street in Marylebone in 1808, along with a companion piece featuring Purfleet, with the reviewer of The Examiner describing It as "one of the finest sea-pieces ever painted by a British artist". It was exhibited again in a retrospective of Turner's held by the British Institution in 1852. It is in the collection of the Museum of Fine Arts in Houston, having been acquired in 2005.

== See also ==
- List of paintings by J. M. W. Turner

== Bibliography ==
- Bailey, Anthony. J.M.W. Turner: Standing in the Sun. Tate Enterprises Ltd, 2013.
- Cusack, Tricia. Art and Identity at the Water's Edge. Routledge, 2012.
- Shanes, Eric. The Life and Masterworks of J.M.W. Turner. Parkstone International, 2012.
- Spencer-Longhurst, Paul. The Sun Rising Through Vapour: Turner's Early Seascapes. Third Millennium Information, 2003.
