= The Burial of Atala =

Painting by Anne-Louis Girodet

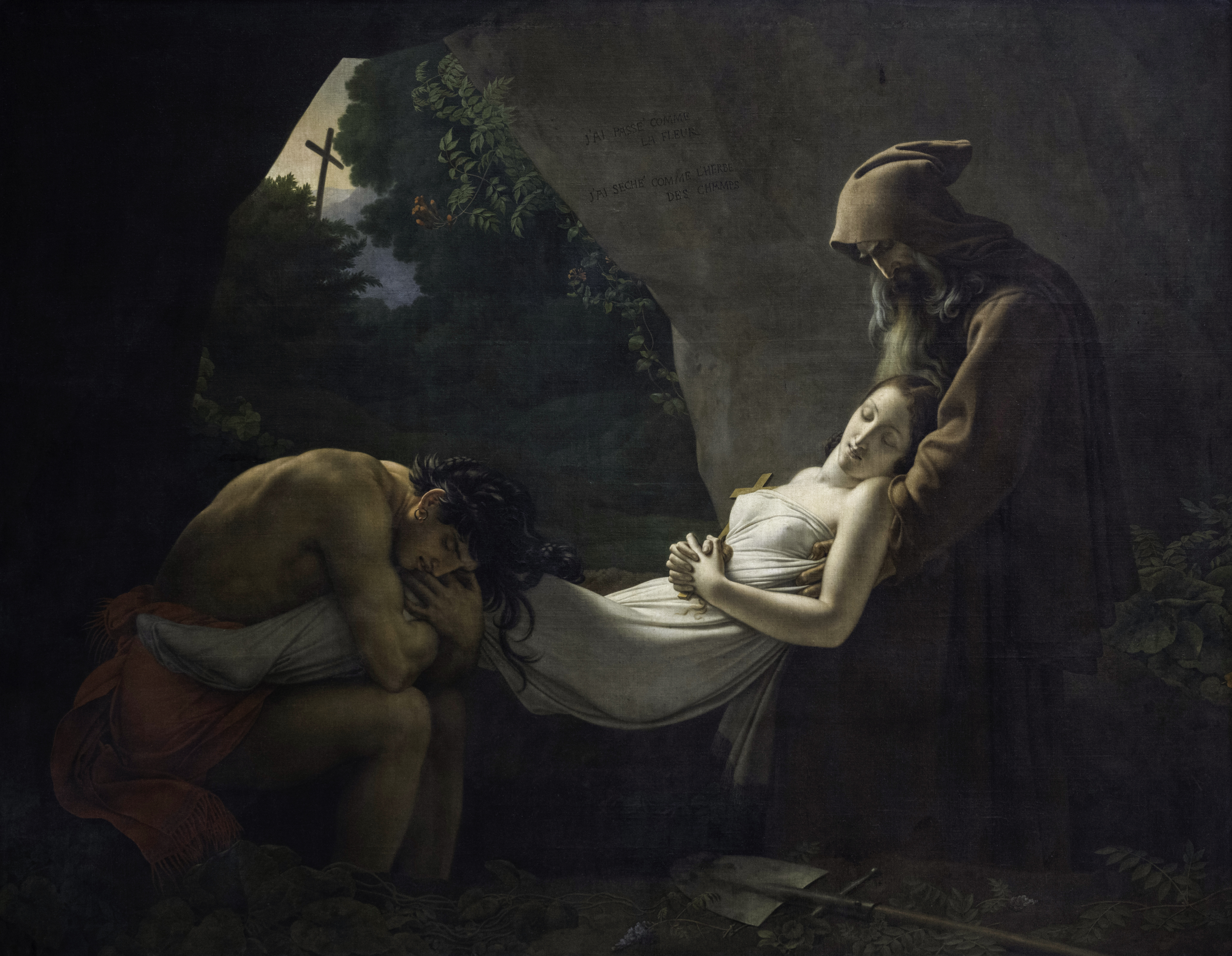
- Artist: Anne-Louis Girodet de Roussy-Trioson
- Year: 1808
- Medium: Oil on canvas
- Dimensions: 207 cm × 267 cm (81 in × 105 in)
- Location: Louvre, Paris

The Burial of Atala or The Funeral of Atala (French: Atala au tombeau) is an 1808 oil-on-canvas painting by the French painter Anne-Louis Girodet de Roussy-Trioson. It depicts a scene from Francois-René de Chateaubriand's novel, Atala, written in 1801. Inspired by this tragic love story, Girodet captures its dramatic tone by combining both Neoclassical and Romantic elements while emphasizing the sensuality of Atala’s death.

First publicly displayed in the Salon of 1808, the painting was well received. It was then acquired by Louis XVIII in 1818. Today, it is held in the Louvre Museum in Paris.

== Context ==
Reacting against the secularism of the French Revolution, both Chateaubriand and Girodet contributed to the revival of Christianity, incorporating religious motifs and iconography into their works.

Chateaubriand’s Atala was part of a larger project, The Genius of Christianity (French: Le Génie du Christianisme), written as a defense of Christianity meant to inspire artists and to emphasize moral ideals. Atala tells the story of a Christian girl, Atala, who fell in love with a Natchez Indian, Chactas. However, this threatens her obligation to her vow of chastity. Atala ultimately chooses to poison herself as a resolution to the struggle between love and the duties of her faith. The story had an immediate impact on artists. The Salon of 1802 featured two paintings directly inspired by Atala. Its tremendous influence persisted over the next half century, as eighteen more paintings were created based on the novel from 1802 to 1848. Girodet was the most significant artist to take up Chateaubriand’s texts at the time.

Girodet’s style was influenced by his teacher, the Neoclassical painter Jacques-Louis David, but it also had elements of early Romanticism. Deviating from the Classical, heroic scenes prevalent in David’s works, Girodet placed more emphasis on emotions, individuality, and imagination in his art. Turning to Renaissance themes as well as contemporary literature for inspiration, Girodet was quickly drawn to the strong sentiments that were present in Chateaubriand’s Atala.

== Description ==
The painting features three distinct figures positioned in front of an archway. In the center of the painting, Atala appears dressed in a white burial shroud with her head facing the viewer. She holds a crucifix and has her hands in a prayer-like gesture. To her right stands a man in a robe, representing the character Father Aubry in the novel. Father Aubry, an old priest, delivered the last rites as Atala died in Chactas's arms. He stands inside the grave and is lifting the upper half of Atala's body as if preparing to lower her into the grave. The unclothed young man to the left of Atala is Chactas, who is clutching tightly onto Atala’s legs at the edge.

In the background of the painting, there is a forest and a cross in the distance, set against the light of dawn. The shovel in the foreground alludes to the digging of the grave. Furthermore, inscribed on the wall of the cave are words quoted from the Book of Job in French, translating to “I have faded like a flower. I have withered like the grass in the fields.”

In this painting, the composition confines viewers within the walls of the cave. David’s influence on Girodet is shown through incorporating the Neoclassical tendency to focus on the instantaneity of the moment that is seemingly frozen in time. However, Girodet also distances himself from the Neoclassical tradition, adding elements of Romanticism. The figures express the sensation of grief distinctly, highlighting Girodet's emphasis on individuality. The light on Atala further stresses the sensuality of the moment, adding a poetic and erotic tone. Girodet accentuates similar Romantic elements of originality, individuality, and imagination across many of his works, including the Sleep of Endymion and the Ossian Receiving the Spirits of the French Heroes.

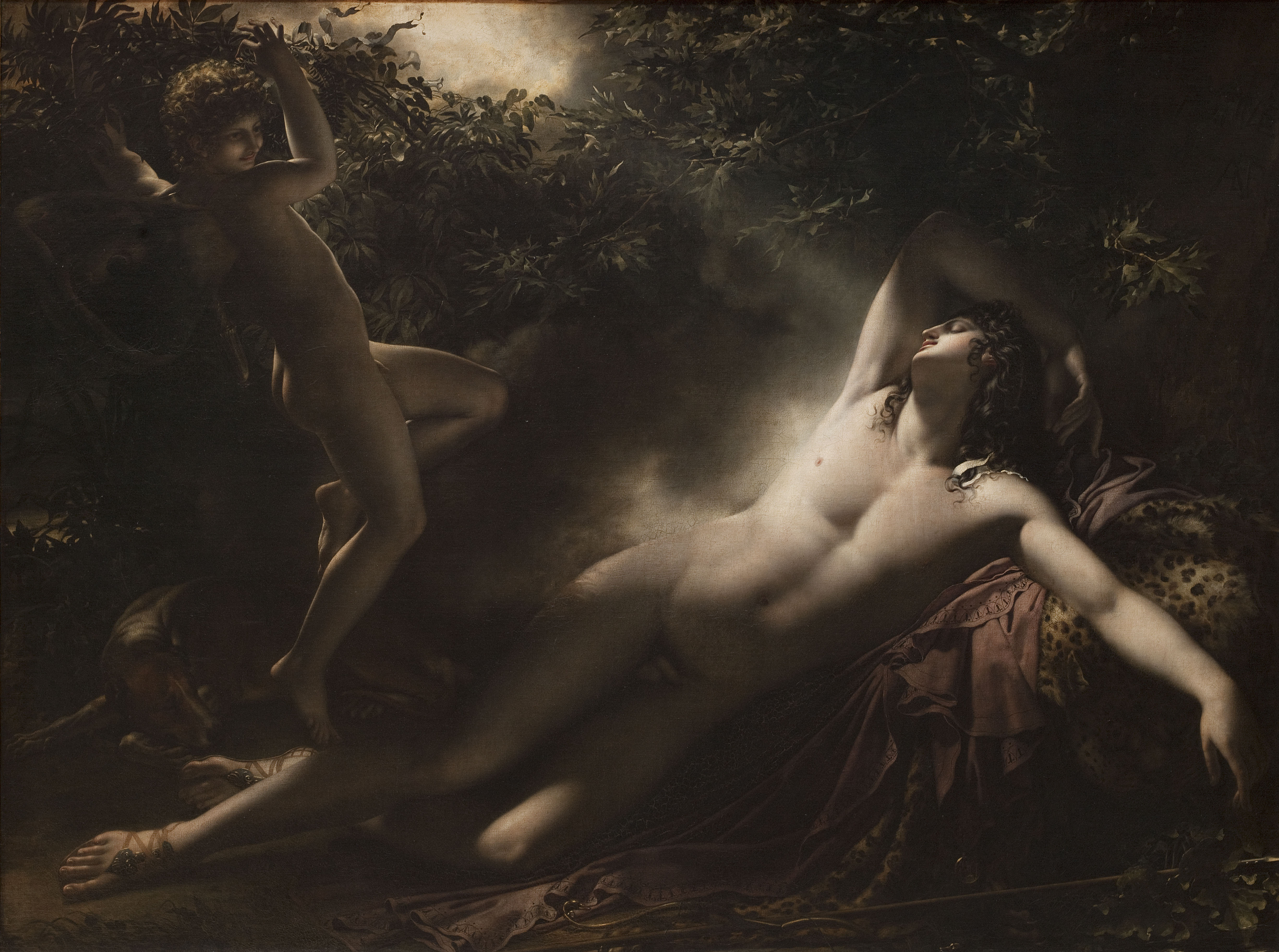
Girodet, Sleep of Endymion, 1791

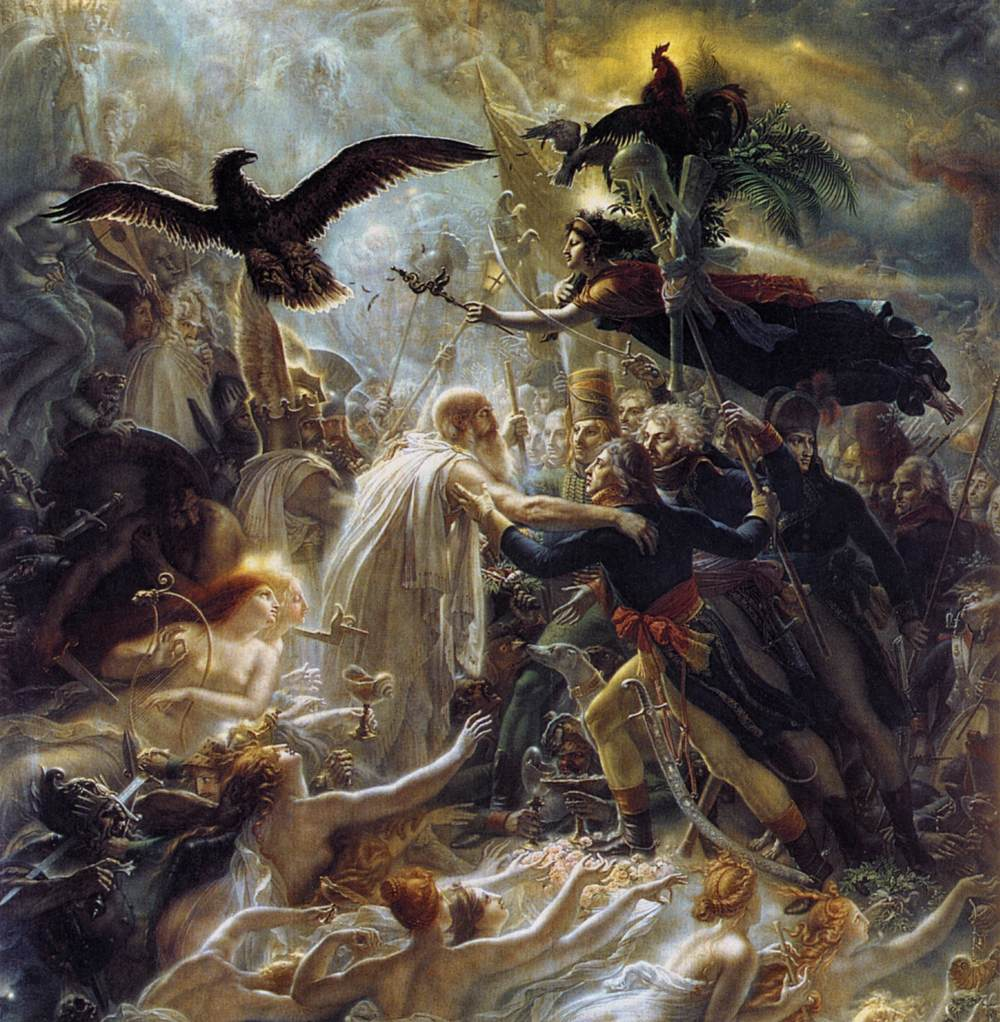
Girodet, Ossian Receiving the Spirits of the French Heroes, 1802
