= Margate (band) =

California melodic rock band

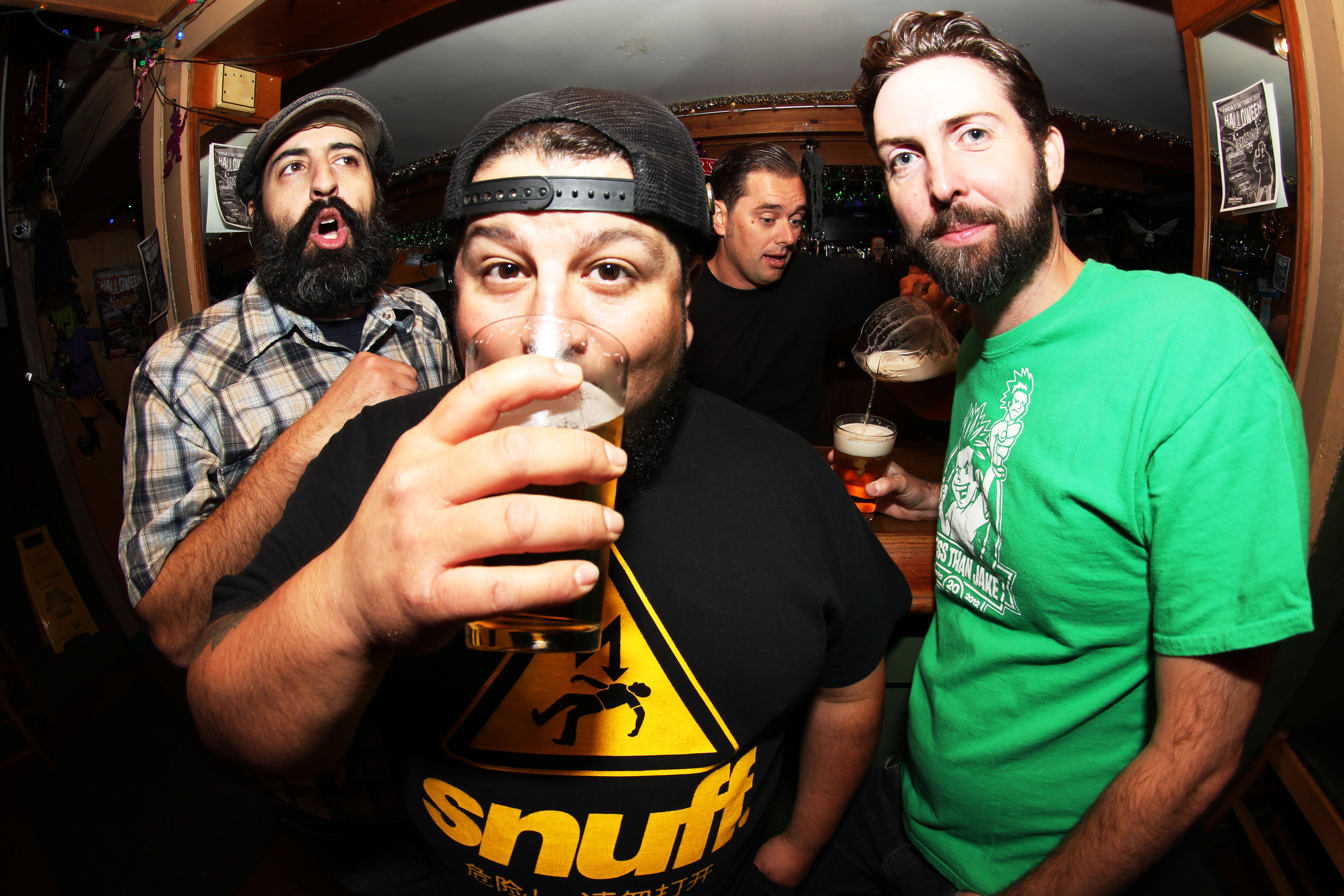

Background information
- Origin: Los Angeles, California, U.S.
- Genres: punk rock, skate punk, pop punk
- Years active: 2003–2017
- Labels: Dogfight Records, Room57 Records, Cyber Tracks, Felony Records
- Members: Alex Helbig; Doug Mitchell; Steve Weil; Jeff Dahlin
- Past members: Leo Ferrante; Brandon Dela Cruz; Todd Johnsen; Joe Tesei
- Website: www.margatemusic.com

Margate is an American melodic punk rock band formed in 2003 and based in Los Angeles, California, United States, consisting of Alex Helbig (drums, lead vocals), Doug Mitchell (guitar, backing vocals), Steve Weil (bass, backing vocals) and Jeff Dahlin (rhythm guitar).

Based on the strength of two self-released, full-length albums (On the Other Side and Songs in the Key of Awesome), their weekly "Live from Room 57" YouTube video series, and their 2011 EP release Rock 'n Roll Reserve, the band was the first signing to Aaron Abeyta (aka El Hefe) and his wife Jennifer Abeyta's record label Cyber Tracks in December 2011.

On May 29, 2012, Margate released a self-titled album on Cyber Tracks which was engineered, mixed and produced by El Hefe. The following week, the band headed out on tour to support NOFX in the Netherlands and UK, during which time they also shared the stage with U.K. Subs, Less Than Jake, Snuff (band), and Anti-Nowhere League.

Since returning to the states, Margate has played with Teenage Bottlerocket, Guttermouth, The Ataris, Death By Stereo, GFP, Union 13, Pour Habit, Nothington, The Dopamines, Go Betty Go and more, and has received regular radio play as a KROQ Locals Only band.

Margate's follow up LP on Cyber Tracks entitled Beards In Paradise was released on June 30, 2015, on limited edition yellow vinyl and digital download, and was followed by a West Coast tour. In April 2016, Margate released Strike Twelve & Margate: Do Each Other, a split 7-inch vinyl with Strike Twelve on Felony Records. In December 2016, the band released Snow Day, an EP of original Holiday themed songs on Cyber Tracks.

On October 6, 2017, the band announced that they were breaking up after 14 years of toiling in obscurity.

== Discography ==
- Snow Day (2016) EP, Cyber Tracks
- Strike Twelve & Margate: Do Each Other (2016), Split 7-inch, Felony Records
- Beards In Paradise (2015), Cyber Tracks
- Margate (2012), Cyber Tracks
- Rock and Roll Reserve (2011) EP, Room57Records
- On the Other Side (2009), Room57Records
- Songs in the Key of Awesome (2006), Dogfight Records
