= Lucien Bonaparte at the Villa Rufinella =

Painting by Francois-Xavier Fabre

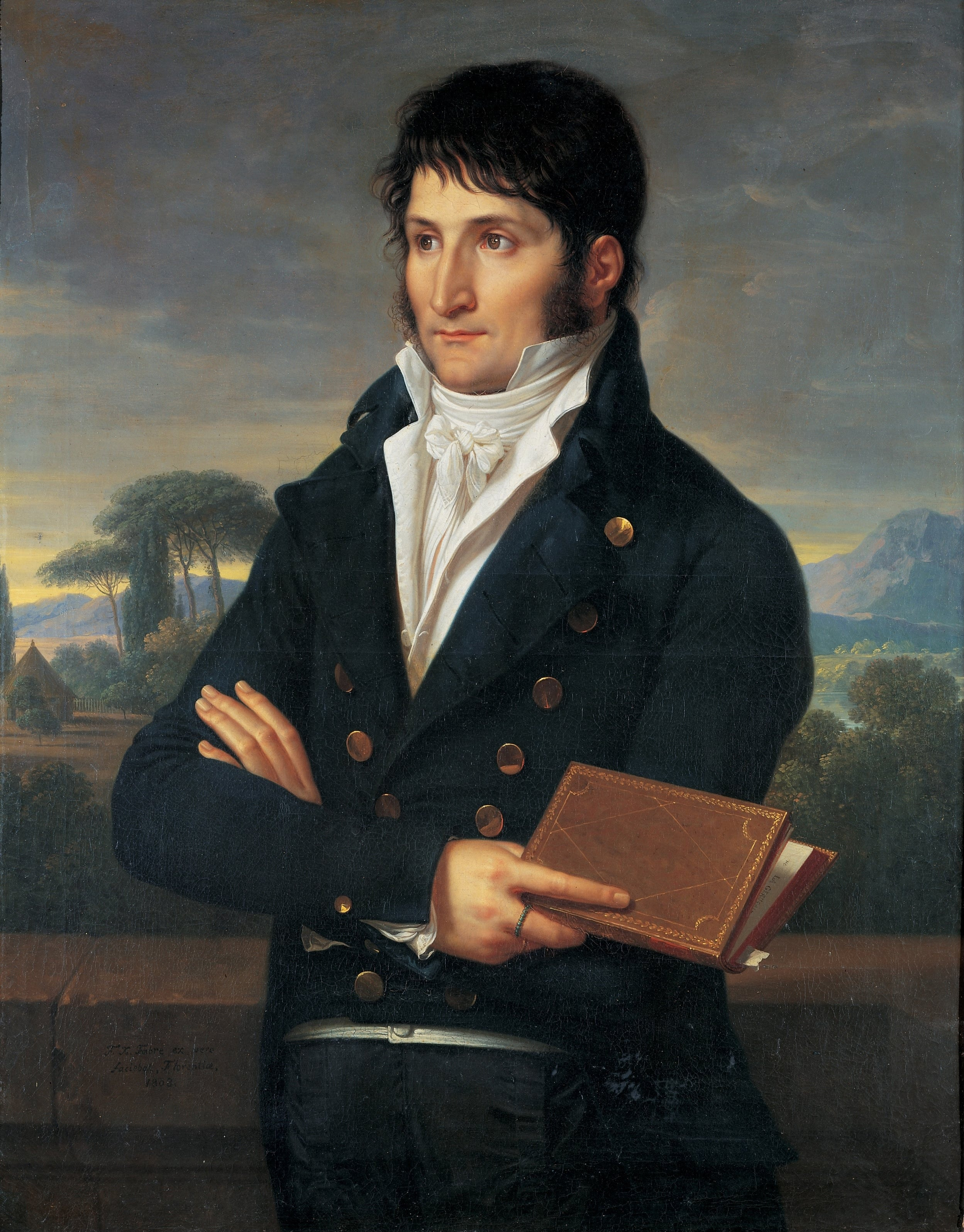
- Artist: Francois-Xavier Fabre
- Year: 1808
- Type: Oil on canvas, portrait painting
- Dimensions: 90 cm × 71 cm (35 in × 28 in)
- Location: Museo Napoleonico; Rome

Lucien Bonaparte at the Villa Rufinella is an 1808 portrait painting by the French artist Francois-Xavier Fabre featuring Lucien Bonaparte, the younger brother of Napoleon the Emperor of France. It depicts him at the Villa Rufinella in the Alban Hills outside Rome, where he had moved after falling out with his brother. He was later captured by the British Royal Navy and spent 1810 to 1814 as a prisoner in England.

Fabre was a former pupil of Jacques-Louis David who specialised in portraits of the elite during the Napoleonic era. Today the picture is in the collection of the Museo Napoleonico in Rome. Another 1812 painting by Fabre is also believed to depict Lucien Bonaparte due to its similarity to this one.

== Bibliography ==
- Gregori, Mina, Luciano Bonaparte: le sue collezioni d'arte, le sue residenze a Roma, nel Lazio, in Italia, 1804-1840. Istituto poligrafico e Zecca dello Stato, 1995.
- González-Palacios, Alvar. David and Napoleonic Painting. Fabbri, 1970.
- Simonetta, Marcello & Arikha, Noga. Napoleon and the Rebel: A Story of Brotherhood, Passion, and Power. St. Martin's Publishing, 2011.
