= Margate (painting) =

Painting by J.M.W. Turner

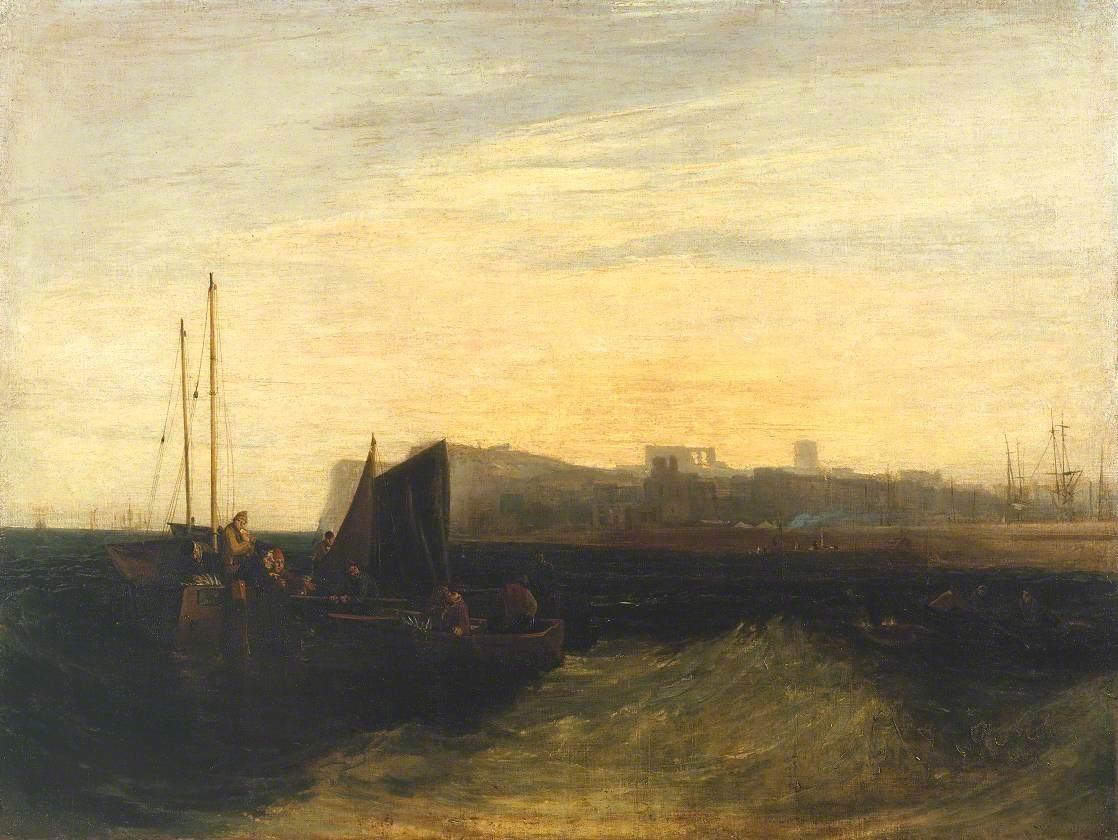
- Artist: J.M.W. Turner
- Year: 1808
- Type: Oil on canvas, landscape painting
- Dimensions: 90 cm × 120.5 cm (35 in × 47.4 in)
- Location: Petworth House; Sussex

Margate is an 1808 landscape painting by the British artist J.M.W. Turner. It depicts a view of the harbour of Margate in Kent. Turner had links with the town from his early years having stayed with relatives and attended a local school.

The work was displayed at Turner's own studio in Queen Anne Street in Marylebone rather than at the Royal Academy Exhibition of 1808 at Somerset House in London. Turner had previously displayed another, smaller view Old Margate Pier at the Royal Academy Exhibition of 1804. The painting was acquired by the art collector George Wyndham, 3rd Earl of Egremont for his country estate at Petworth House in Sussex. Today it remains in the collection of Petworth along with several other works by Turner, although since 1984 formal ownership has transferred to the Tate Galleries.

== See also ==
- List of paintings by J. M. W. Turner

== Bibliography ==
- Bailey, Anthony. J.M.W. Turner: Standing in the Sun. Tate Enterprises Ltd, 2013.
- Cusack, Tricia. Art and Identity at the Water's Edge. Routledge, 2012.
- Shanes, Eric. The Life and Masterworks of J.M.W. Turner. Parkstone International, 2012.
- Spencer-Longhurst, Paul. The Sun Rising Through Vapour: Turner's Early Seascapes. Third Millennium Information, 2003.
