= Napoleon Wounded at Ratisbon =

Painting by Claude Gautherot

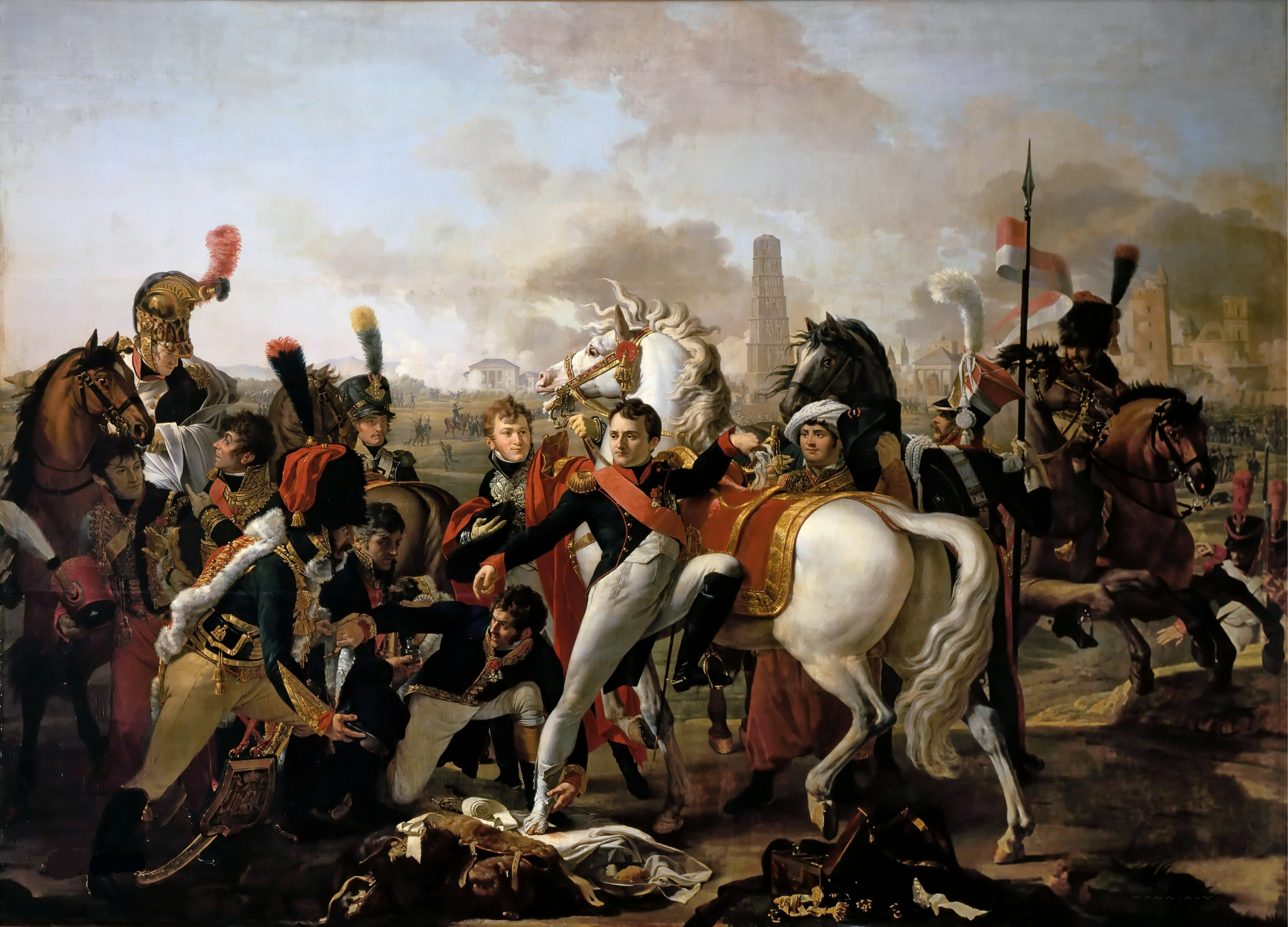
- Artist: Claude Gautherot
- Year: 1810
- Type: Oil on canvas, history painting
- Dimensions: 473 cm × 529 cm (186 in × 208 in)
- Location: Palace of Versailles; Versailles

Napoleon Wounded at Ratisbon (French: Napoleon blesse devant Ratisbonne) is an 1810 history painting by the French artist Claude Gautherot. It depicts an incident at the Battle of Ratisbon, fought on 23 April 1809 during the Napoleonic Wars. Part of the War of the Fifth Coalition, the French Emperor Napoleon led the Grande Armée to victory over Austrian forces under Archduke Charles. It portrays the moment Napoleon, wounded in the ankle by enemy artillery fire, mounts a fresh horse. It is one of a number of paintings in which his valet and bodyguard Roustam Raza appears. The Polish general Dezydery Chłapowski is also shown nearby as is Napoleon's Chief of Staff Louis-Alexandre Berthier.

The painting was displayed at the Salon of 1810 held at the Louvre in Paris. Originally commissioned by Napoleon for the Tuileries Palace, it was later transferred in 1835 to the Palace of Versailles.

== Bibliography ==
- Grigsby, Darcy Grimaldo. Extremities: Painting Empire in Post-revolutionary France. Yale University Press, 2002.
