= Salon of 1810 =

1814 art exhibition in Paris

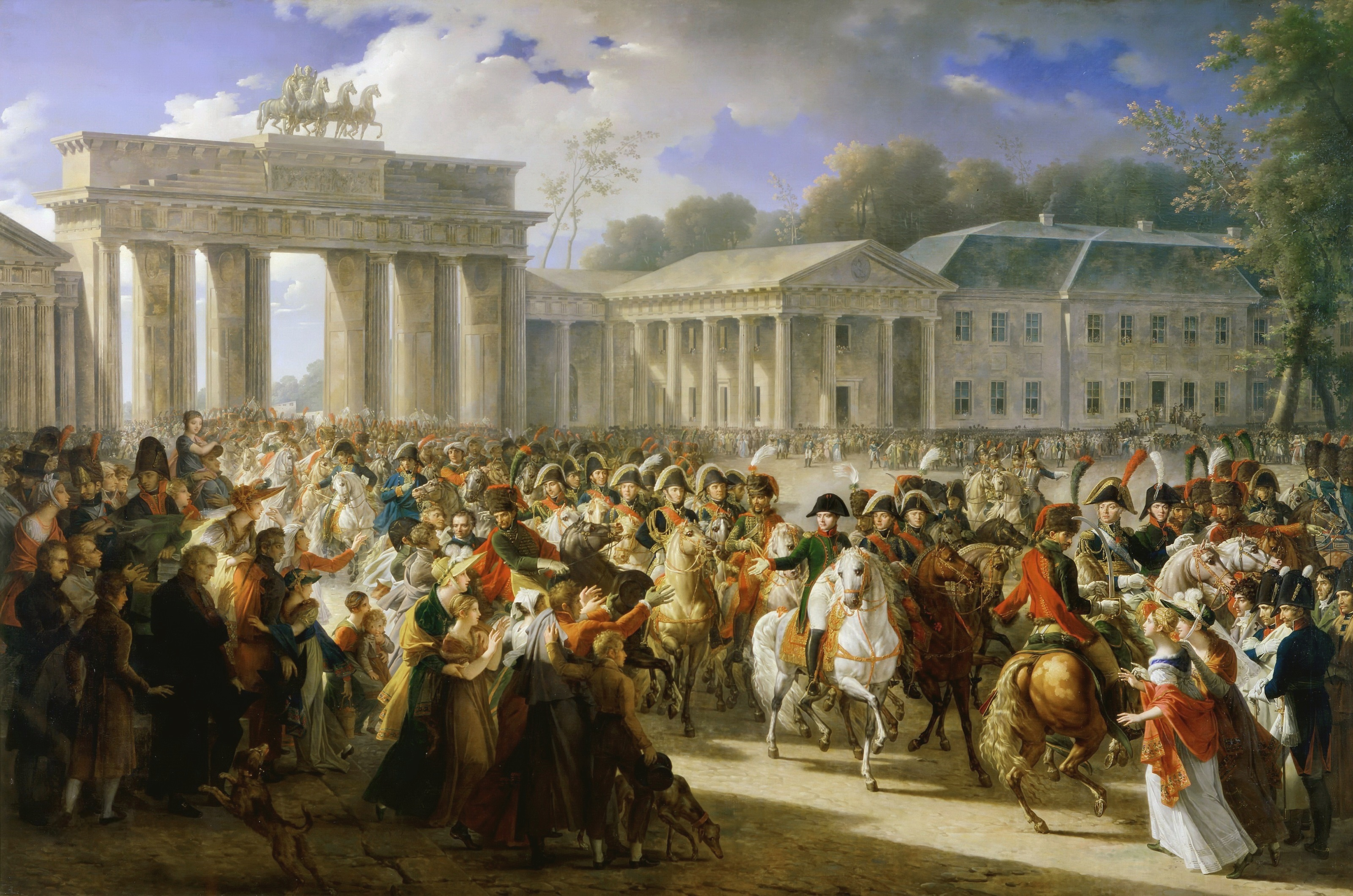
Entry of Napoleon into Berlin by Charles Meynier

The Salon of 1810 was an art exhibition held at the Louvre in Paris, part of the series of Salons held to display paintings, sculptures and engravings. It opened on 5 November 1810 and lasted until April 1811. It was the penultimate Salon to be held during the Napoleonic era and was followed by the Salon of 1812.

It included a number of paintings featuring Napoleon and his military campaigns including The Battle of Austerlitz by François Gérard and The Revolt of Cairo by Girodet. Napoleon himself purchased twenty paintings exhibited at the Salon at a cost of 47,000 francs. Jacques François Joseph Swebach-Desfontaines's The Passage of the Danube by Napoleon Before the Battle of Wagram was awarded a gold medal. Also on display were the Portrait of Chateaubriand by Girodet, Portrait of General Colbert-Chabanais by Gérard and the Portrait of Henri Jacques Guillaume Clarke, the Minister of War, by François-Xavier Fabre. Pierre-Nicolas Beauvallet exhibited a plaster sculpture of Suzanne in her Bath which was a popular success and led to Napoleon commissioning a version in marble.

Jacques-Louis David's The Coronation of Napoleon was on display again, having also appeared at the Salon of 1808. Its appearance at the 1810 Salon was captured by Louis-Léopold Boilly in his The Public Viewing David's 'Coronation' at the Louvre.

== Gallery ==
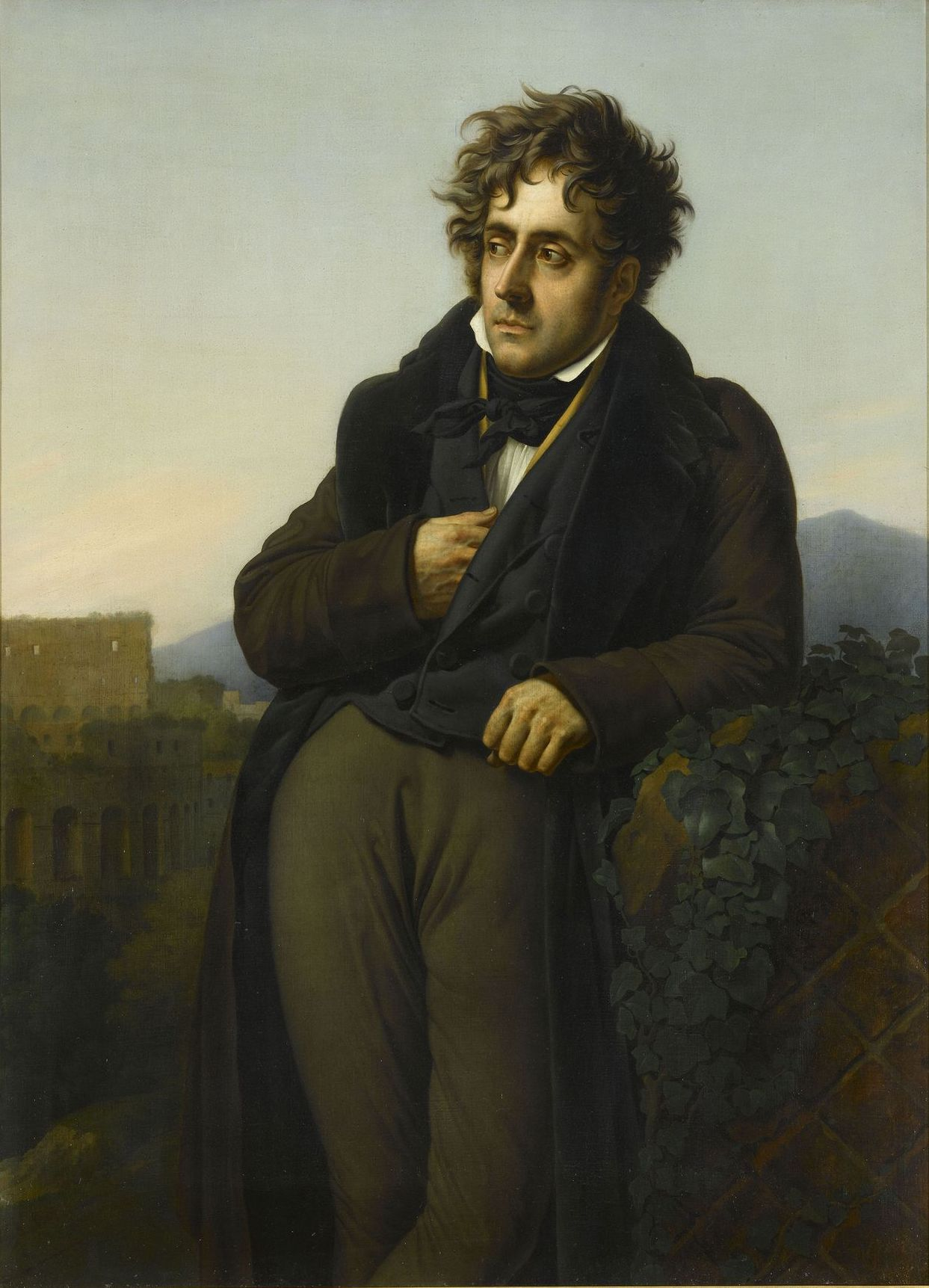
Portrait of Chateaubriand by Anne-Louis Girodet de Roussy-Trioson

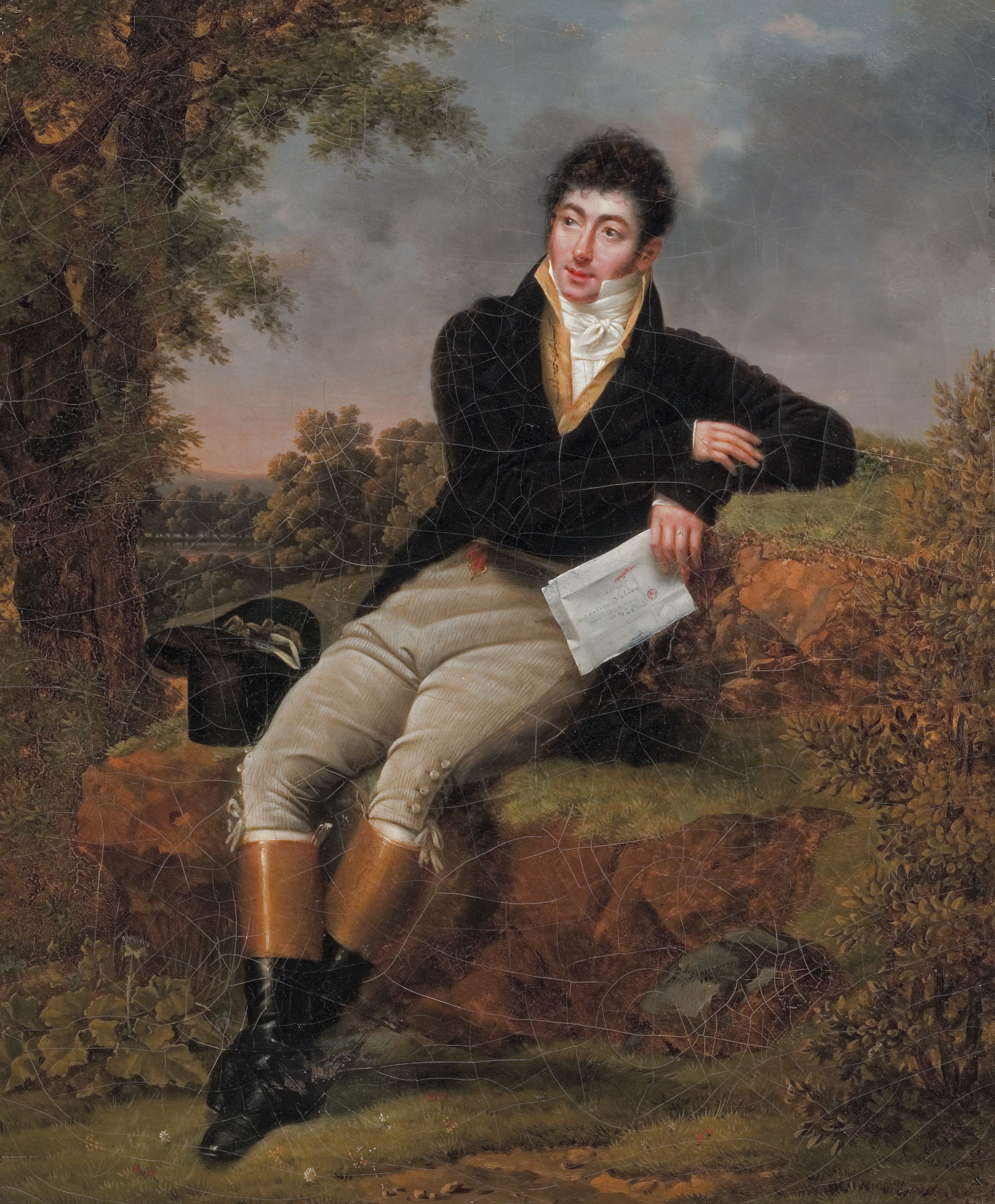
Portrait of Antoine Valedau by Adèle Romany

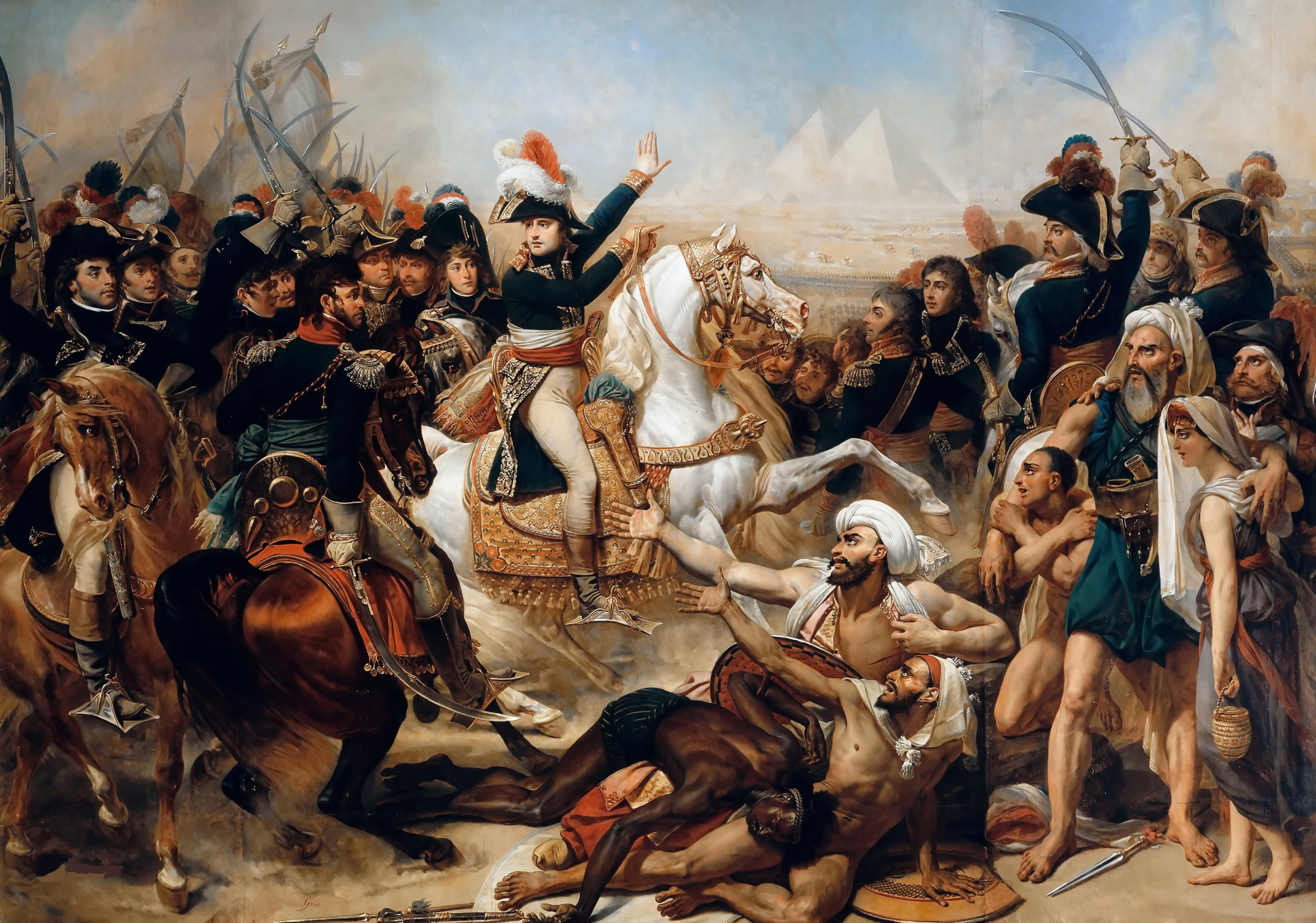
The Battle of the Pyramids by Antoine-Jean Gros, 1810

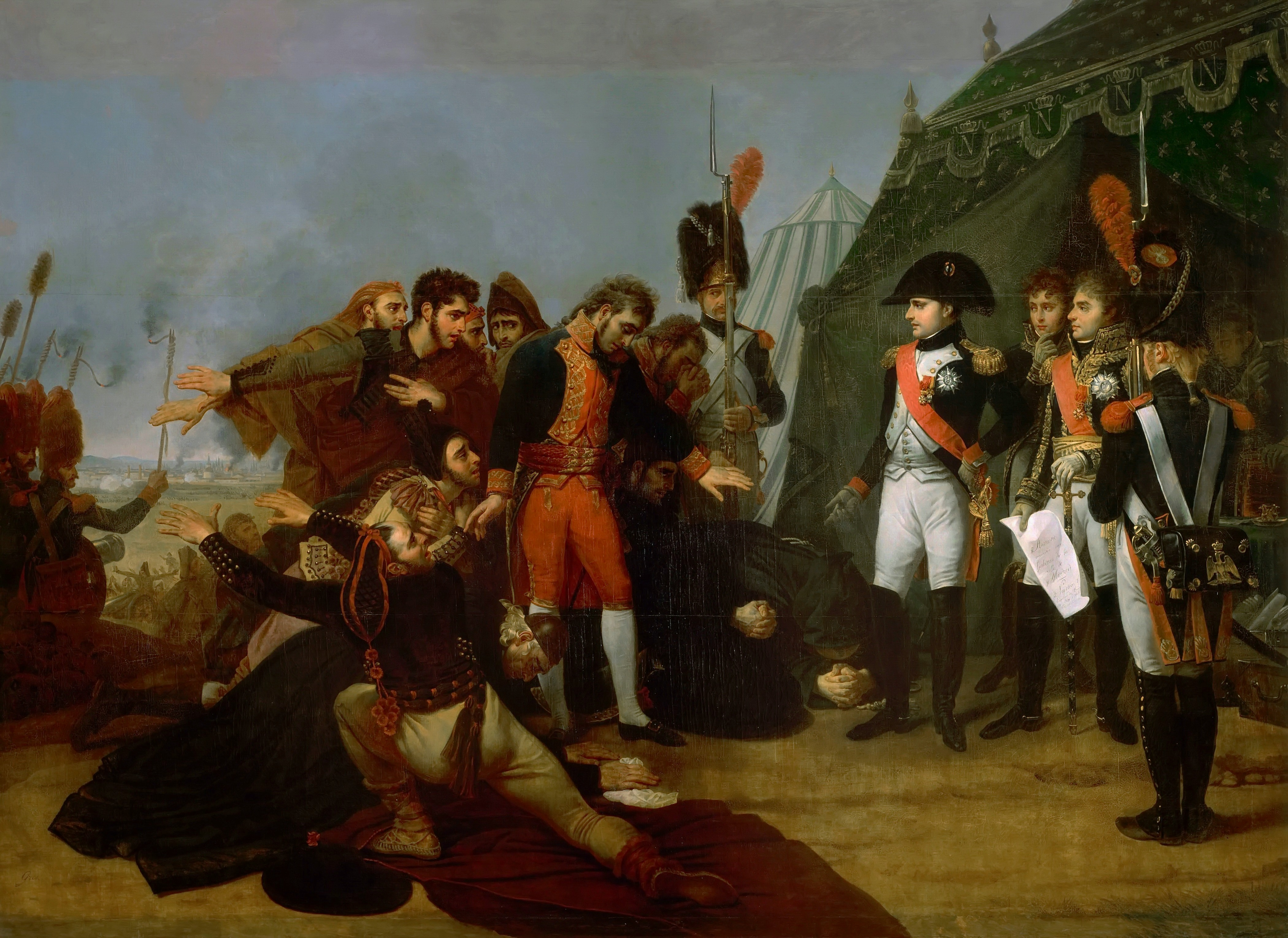
Napoleon Accepting the Surrender of Madrid by Antoine-Jean Gros

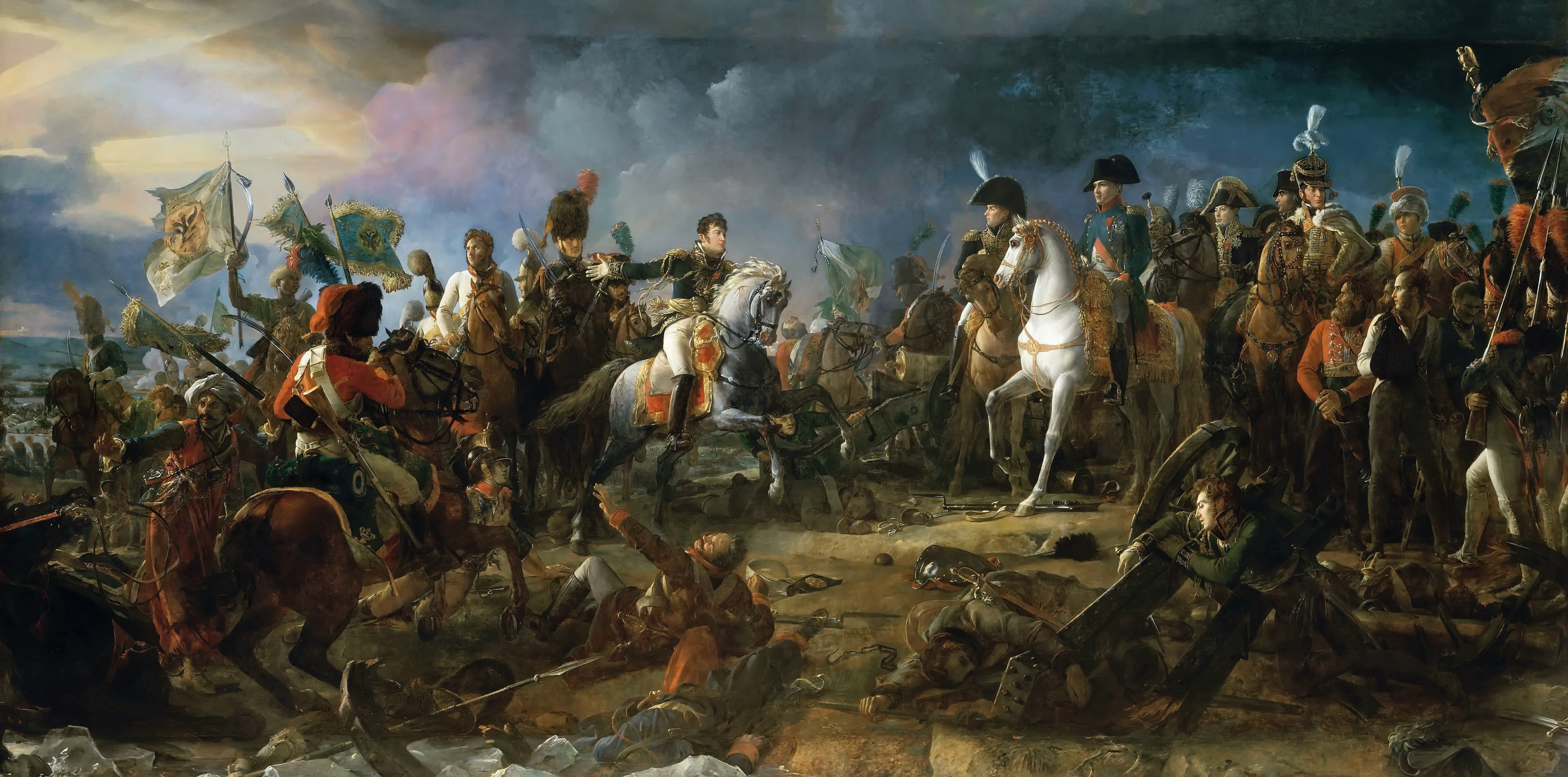
The Battle of Austerlitz by François Gérard

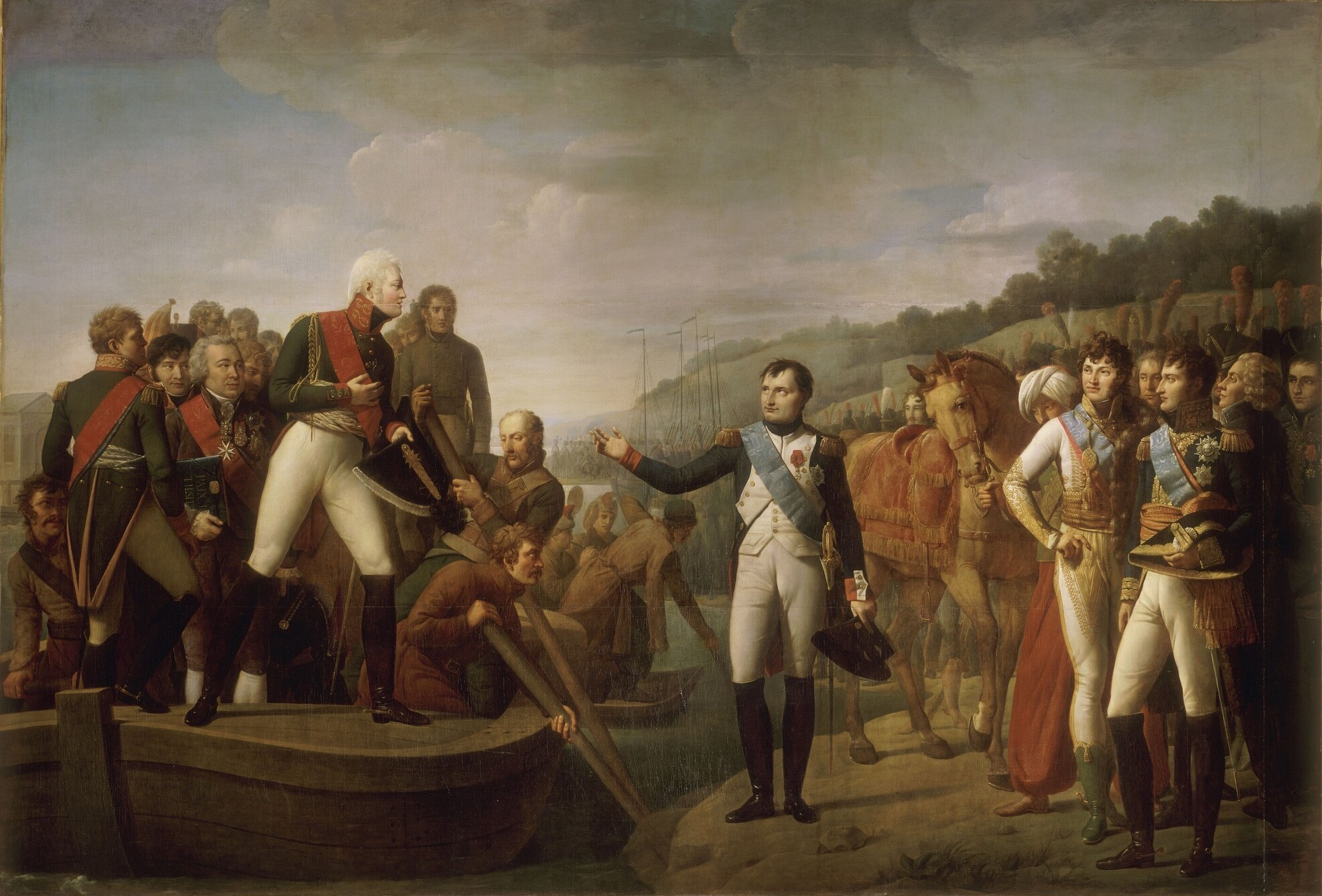
Farewell of Napoleon and Alexander after the Peace of Tilsit by Gioacchino Giuseppe Serangeli

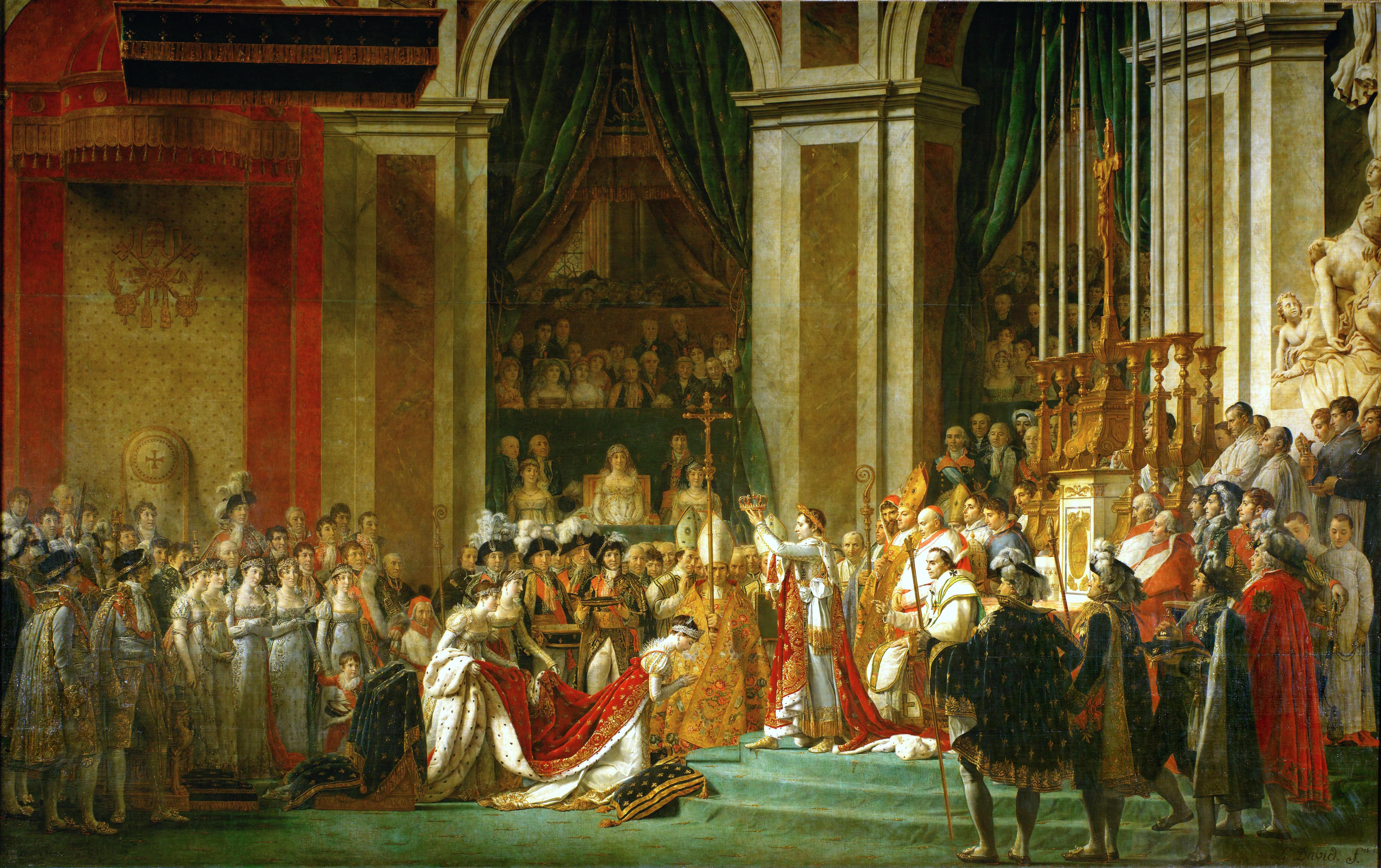
The Coronation of Napoleon by Jacques-Louis David

The Distribution of the Eagle Standards by Jacques-Louis David

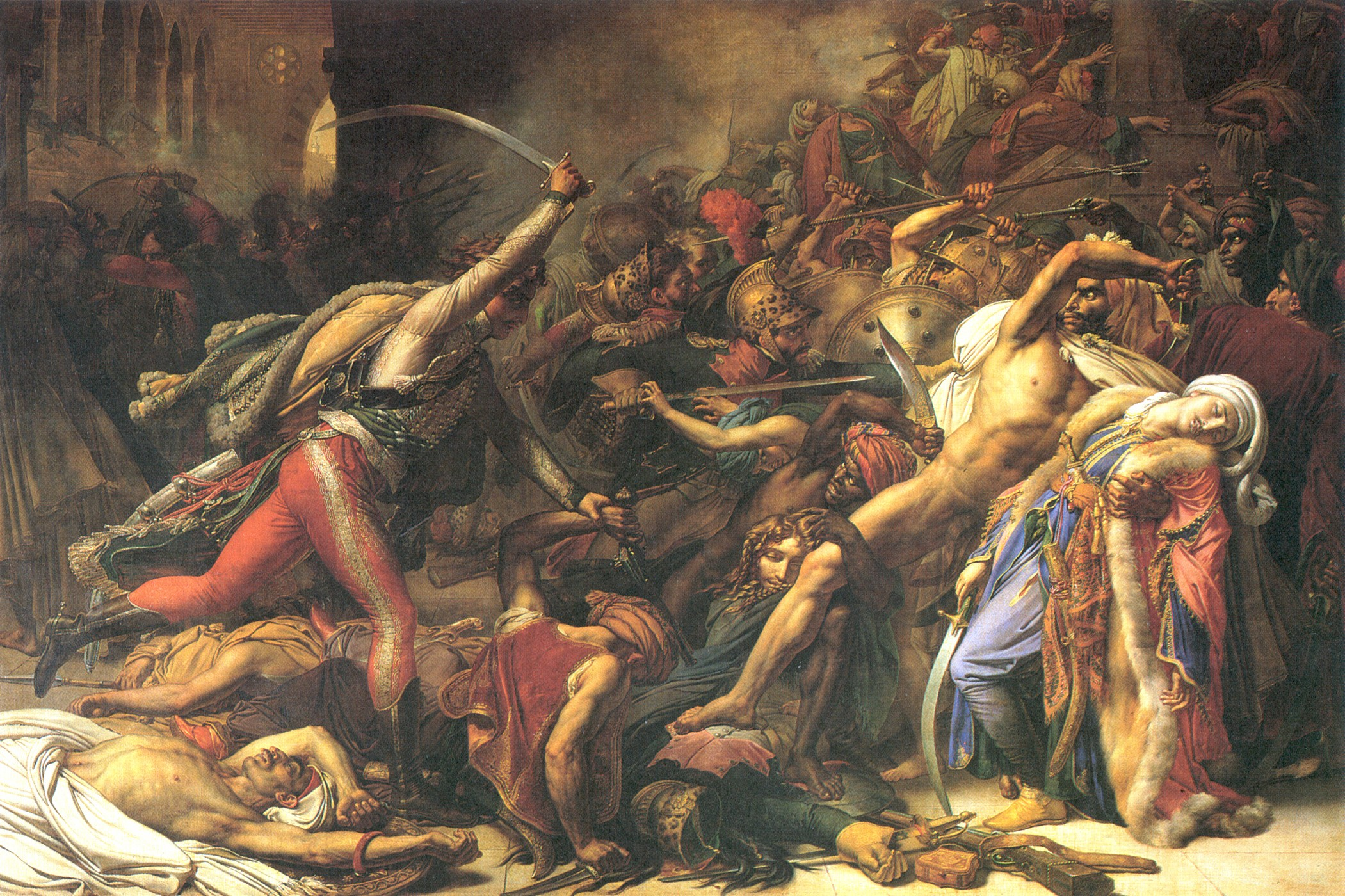
The Revolt of Cairo by Anne-Louis Girodet de Roussy-Trioson

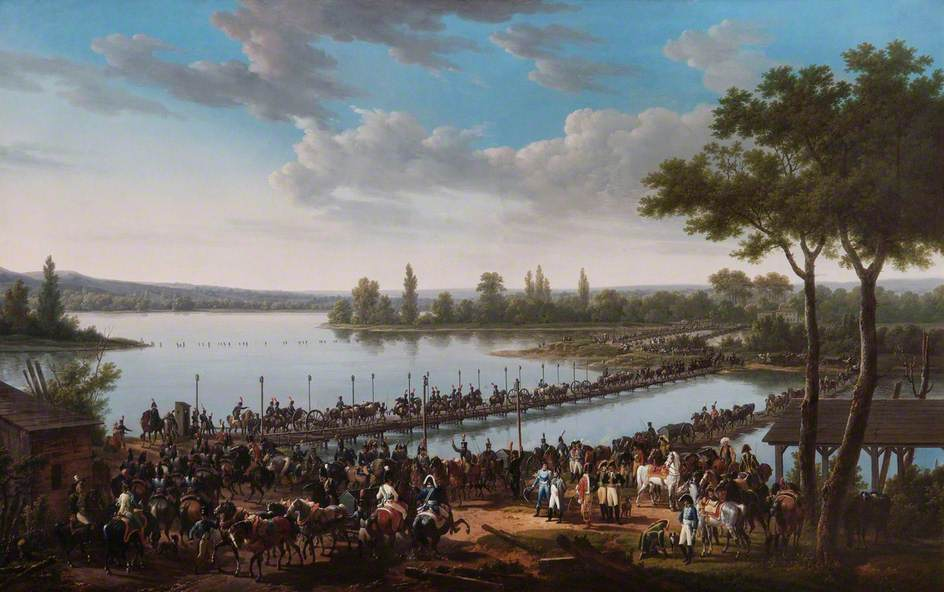
The Passage of the Danube by Napoleon Before the Battle of Wagram by Jacques François Joseph Swebach-Desfontaines

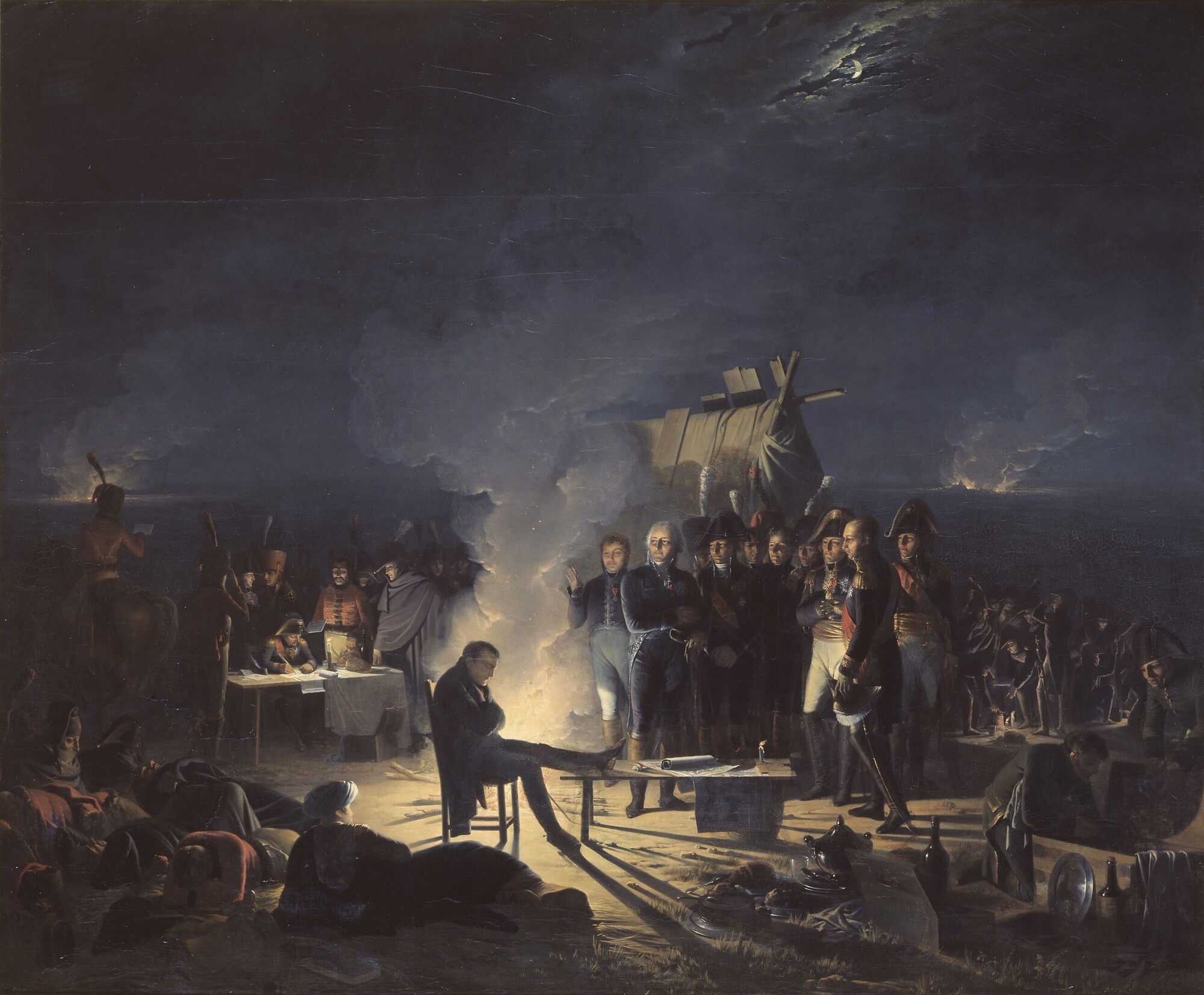
Napoleon's Bivouac on the Battlefield of Wagram by Adolphe Roehn

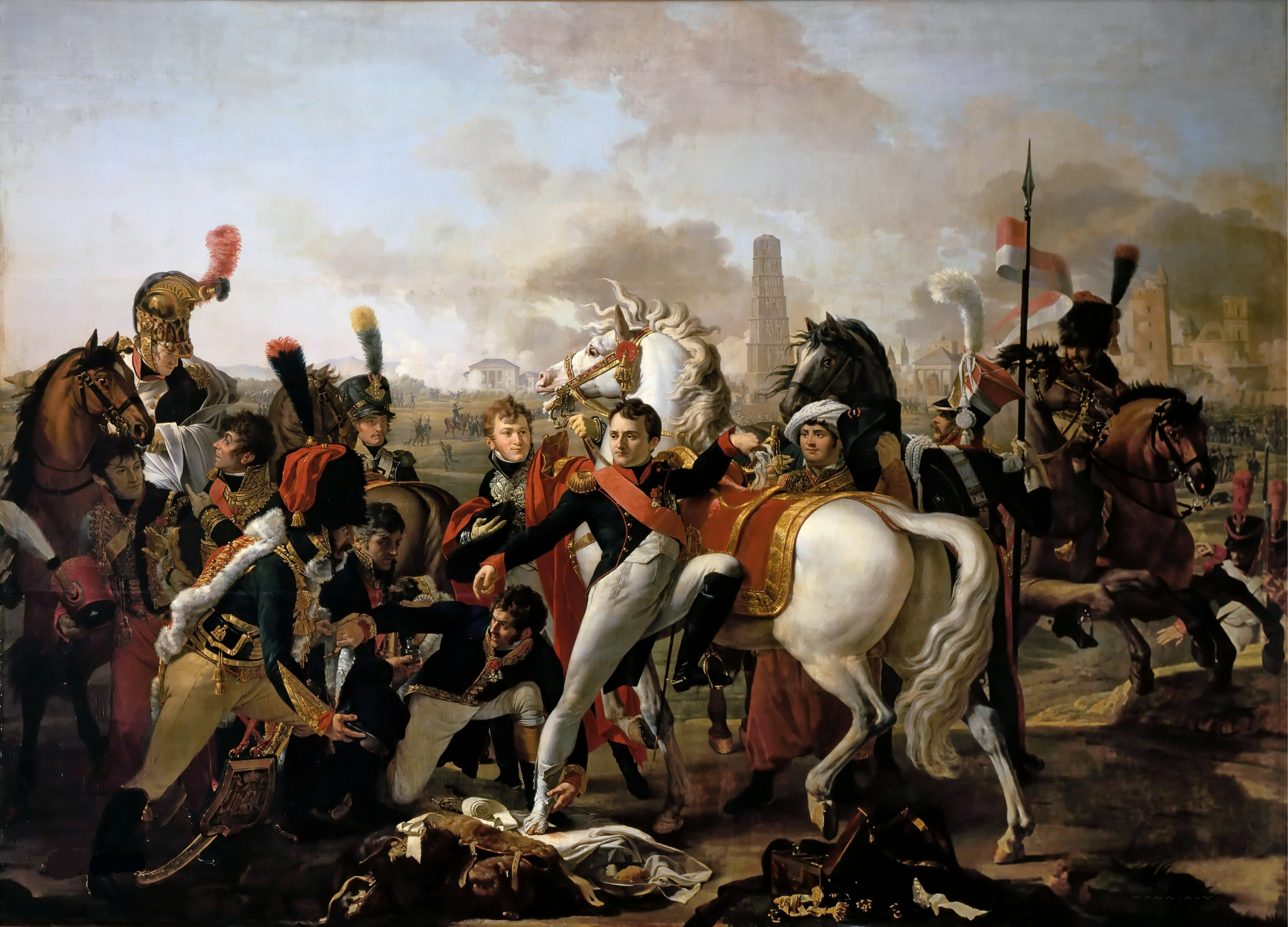
Napoleon Wounded at Ratisbon by Claude Gautherot

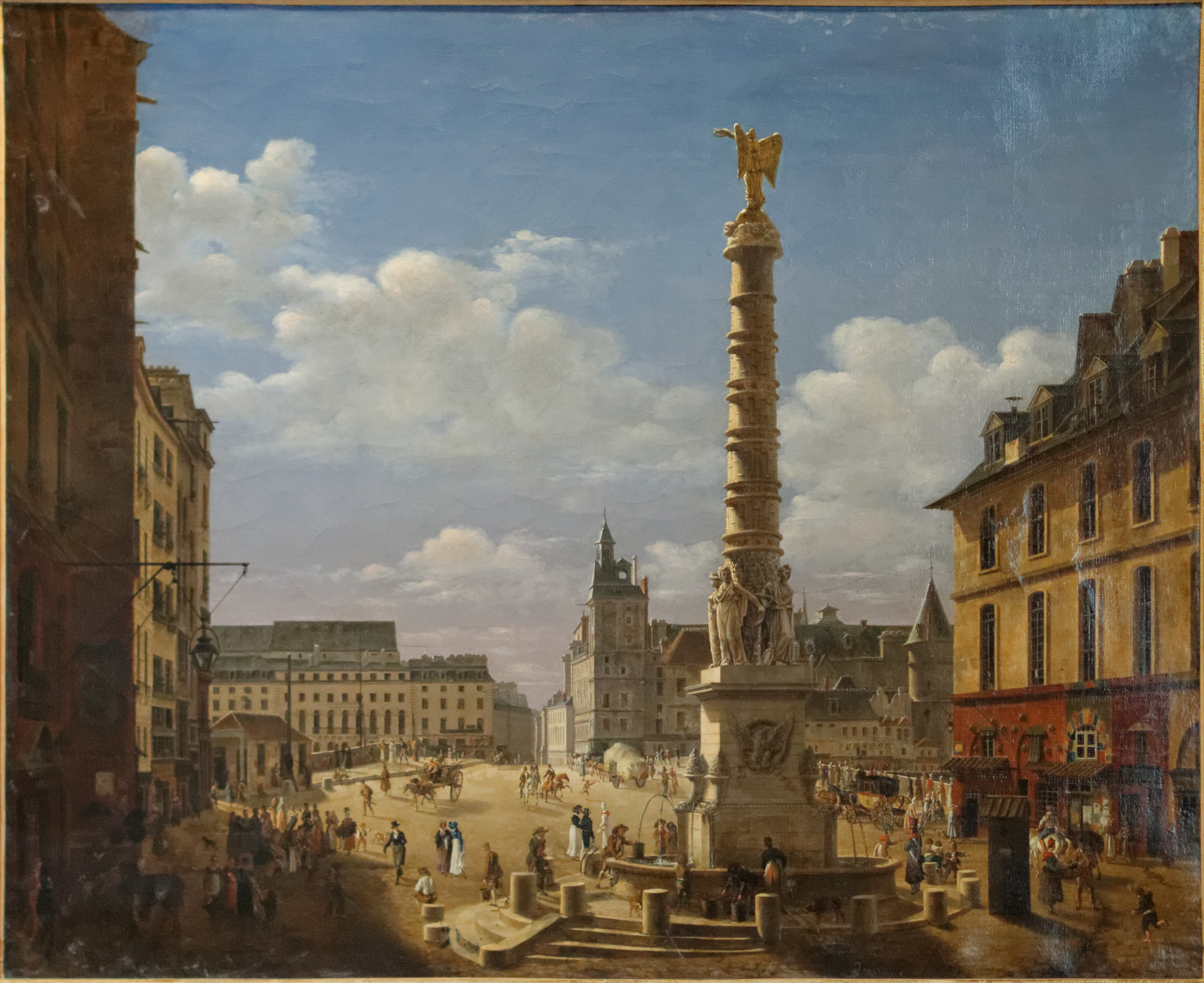
Place du Châtelet by Étienne Bouhot

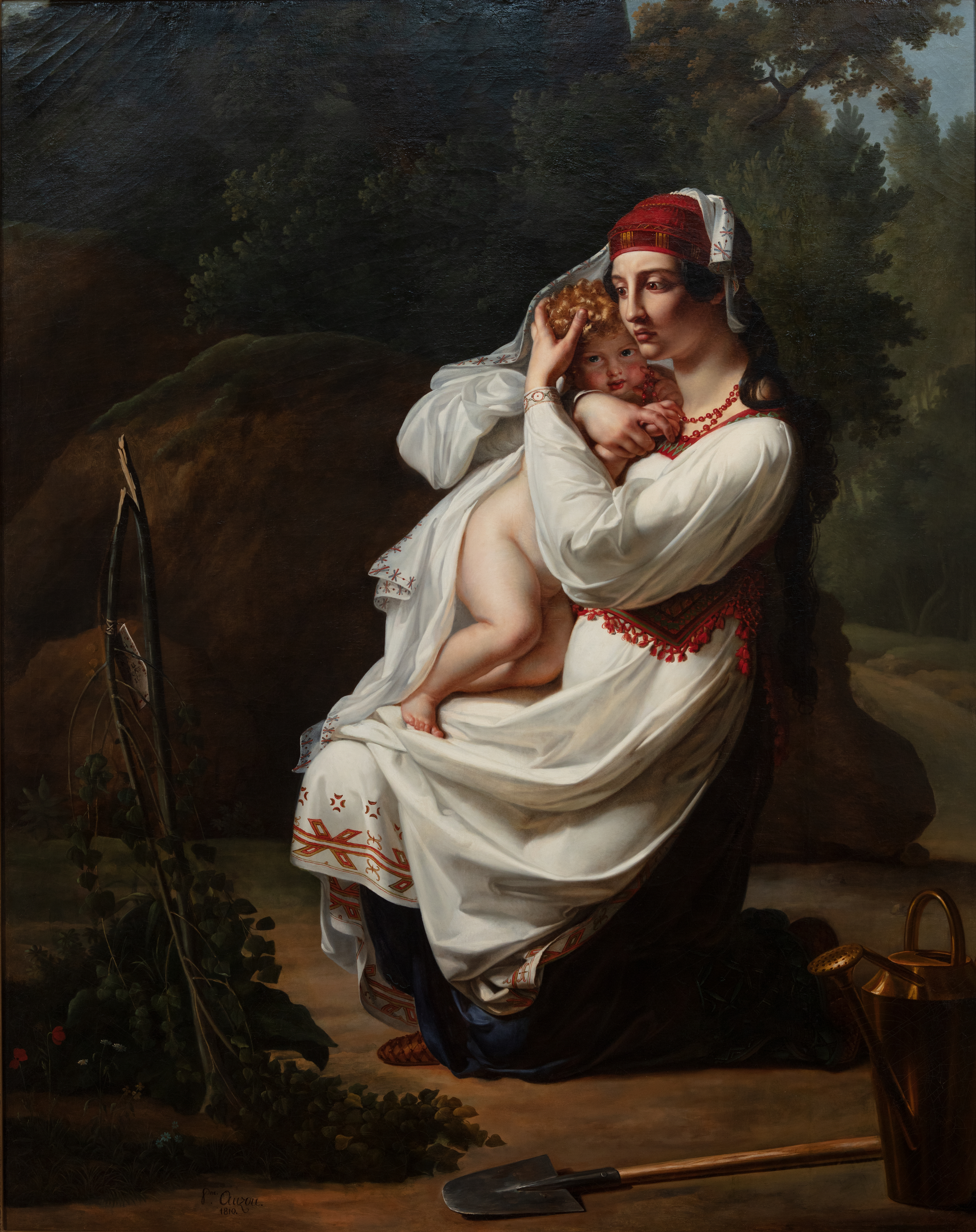
Daria, or Maternal Terror by Pauline Auzou

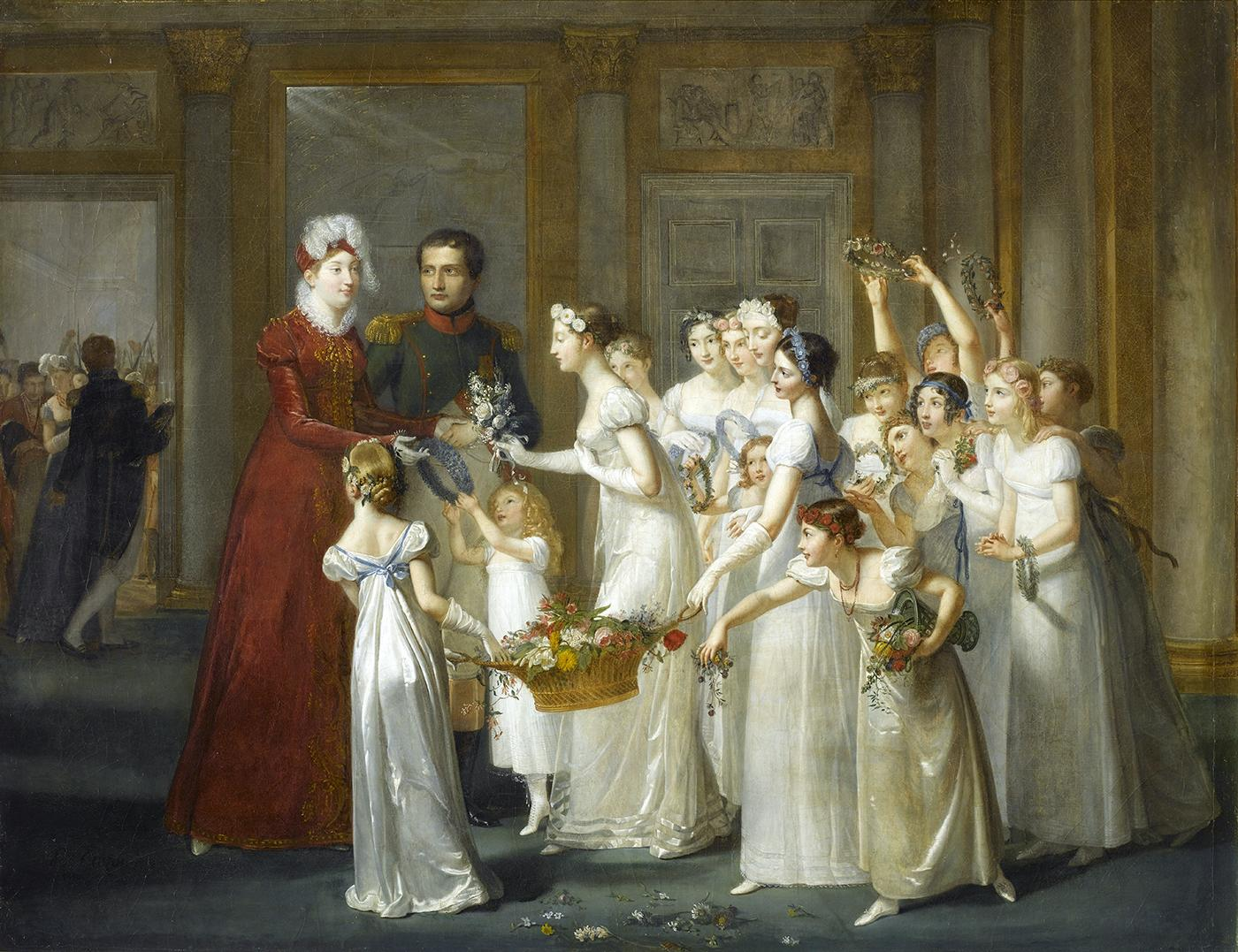
Arrival of Archduchess Marie-Louise in Compiègne by Pauline Auzou

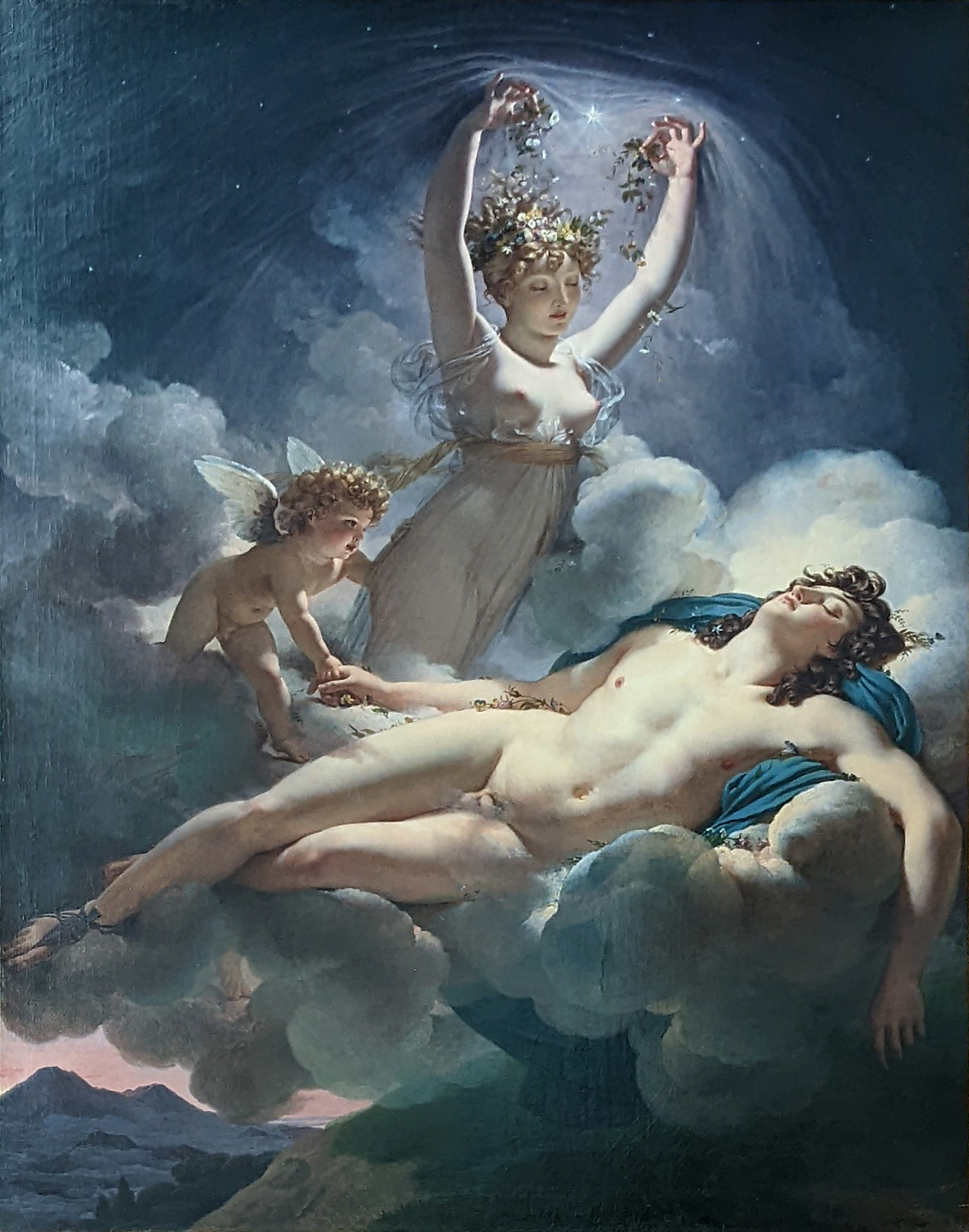
Aurora and Cephalus by Pierre-Narcisse Guérin

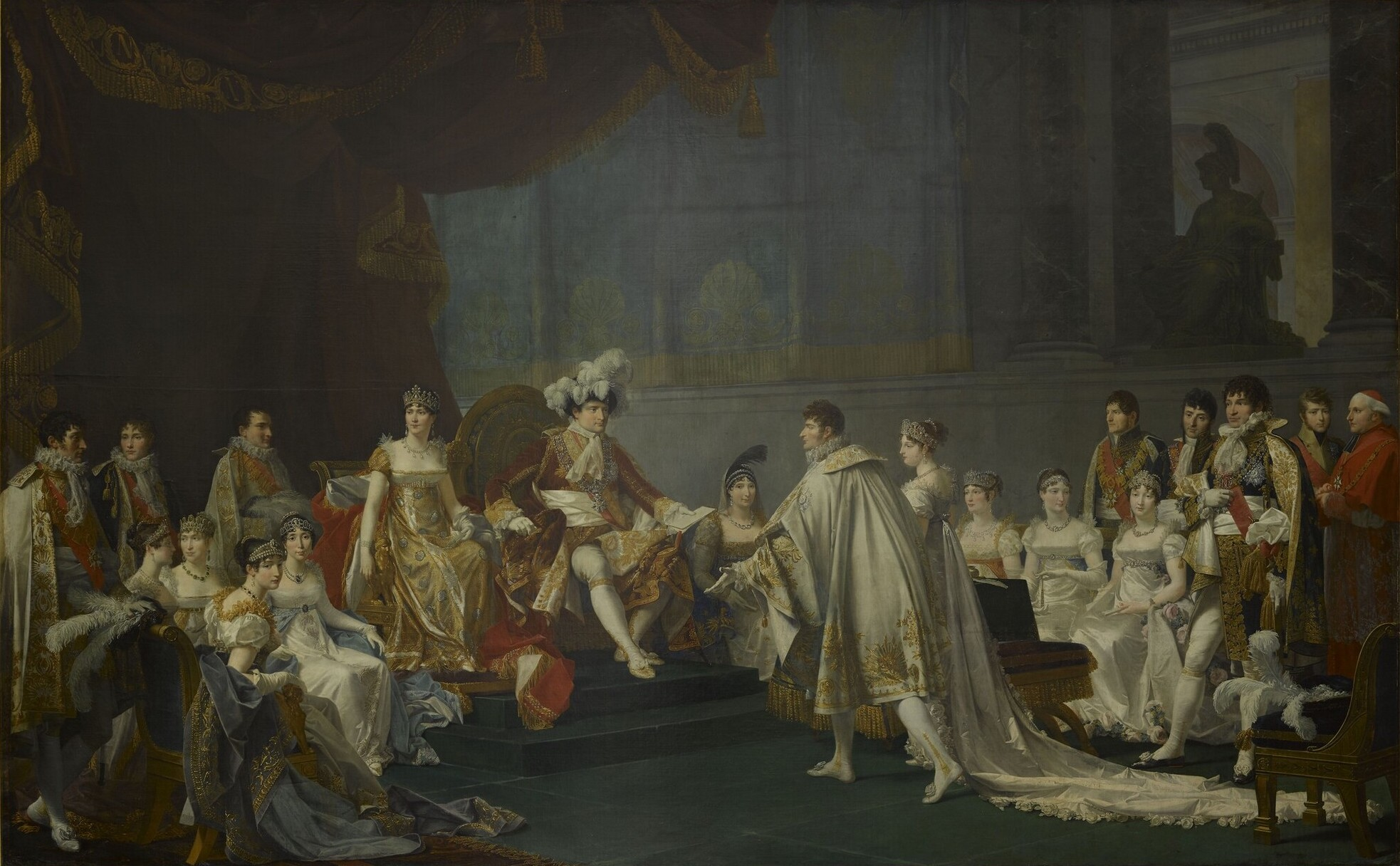
The Wedding of Jérôme Bonaparte and Catherine of Württemberg by Jean-Baptiste Regnault

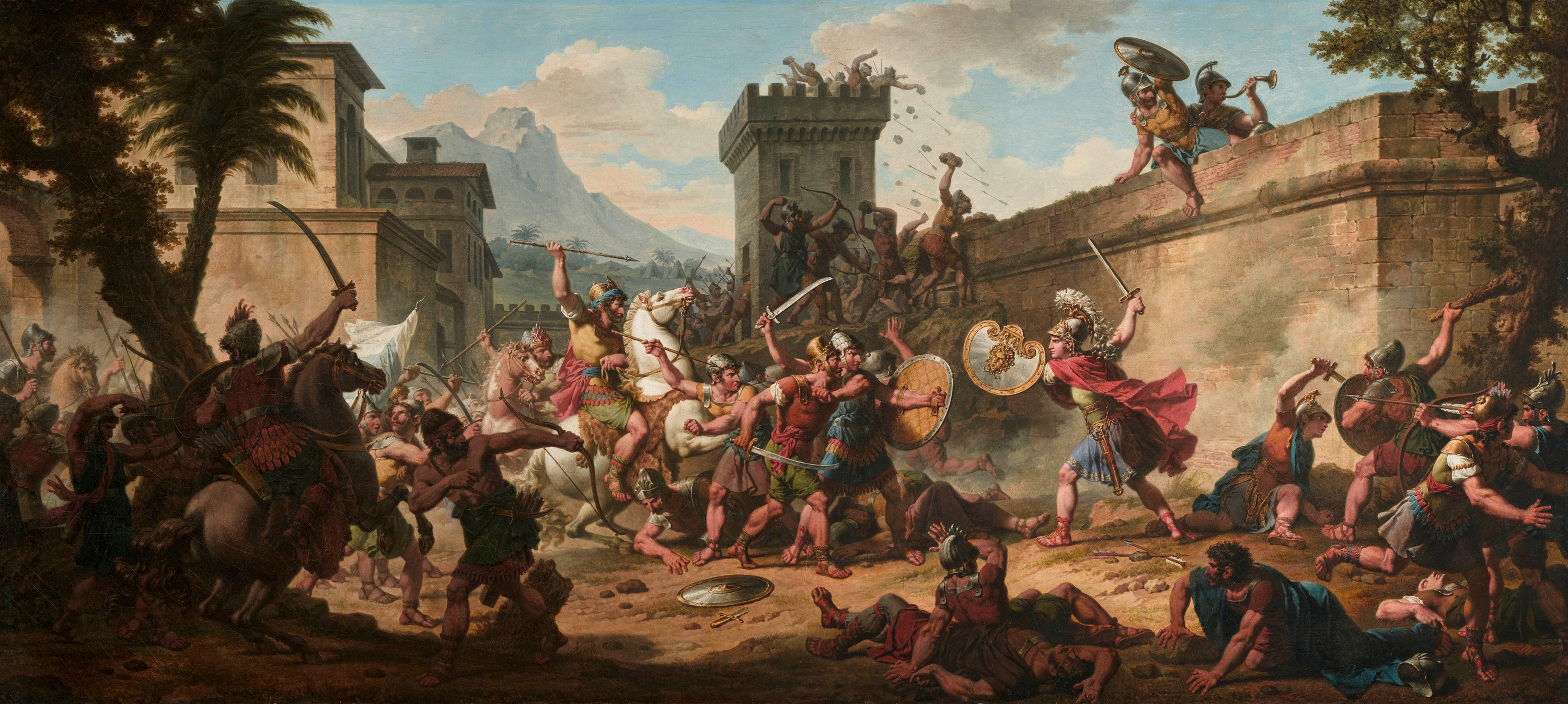
Alexander the Great Attacking the Oxydrakai by Nicolas-André Monsiau

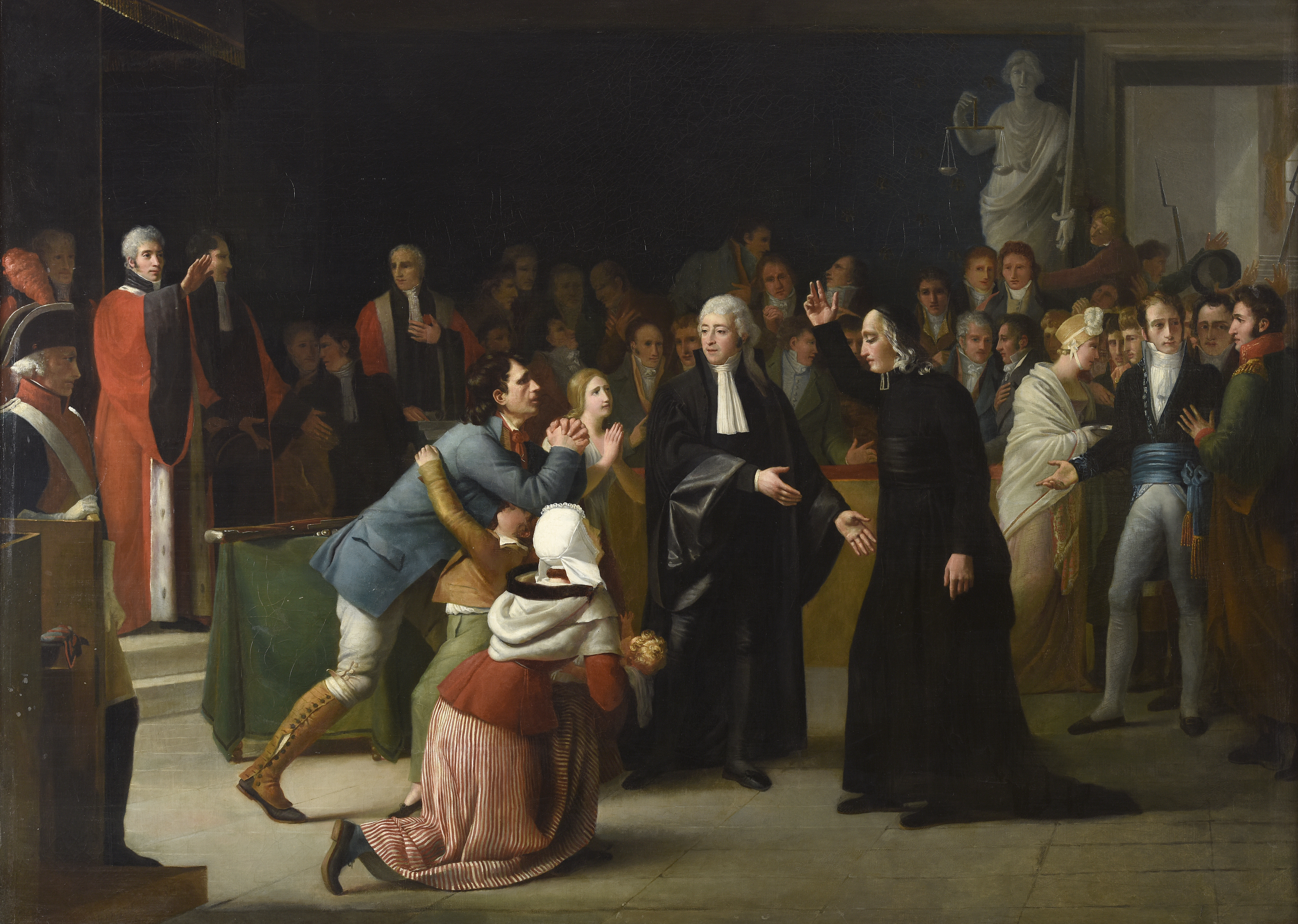
Pierre Fourrey Discharged from the Criminal Charge Brought Against Him by Jean Baptiste Vermay

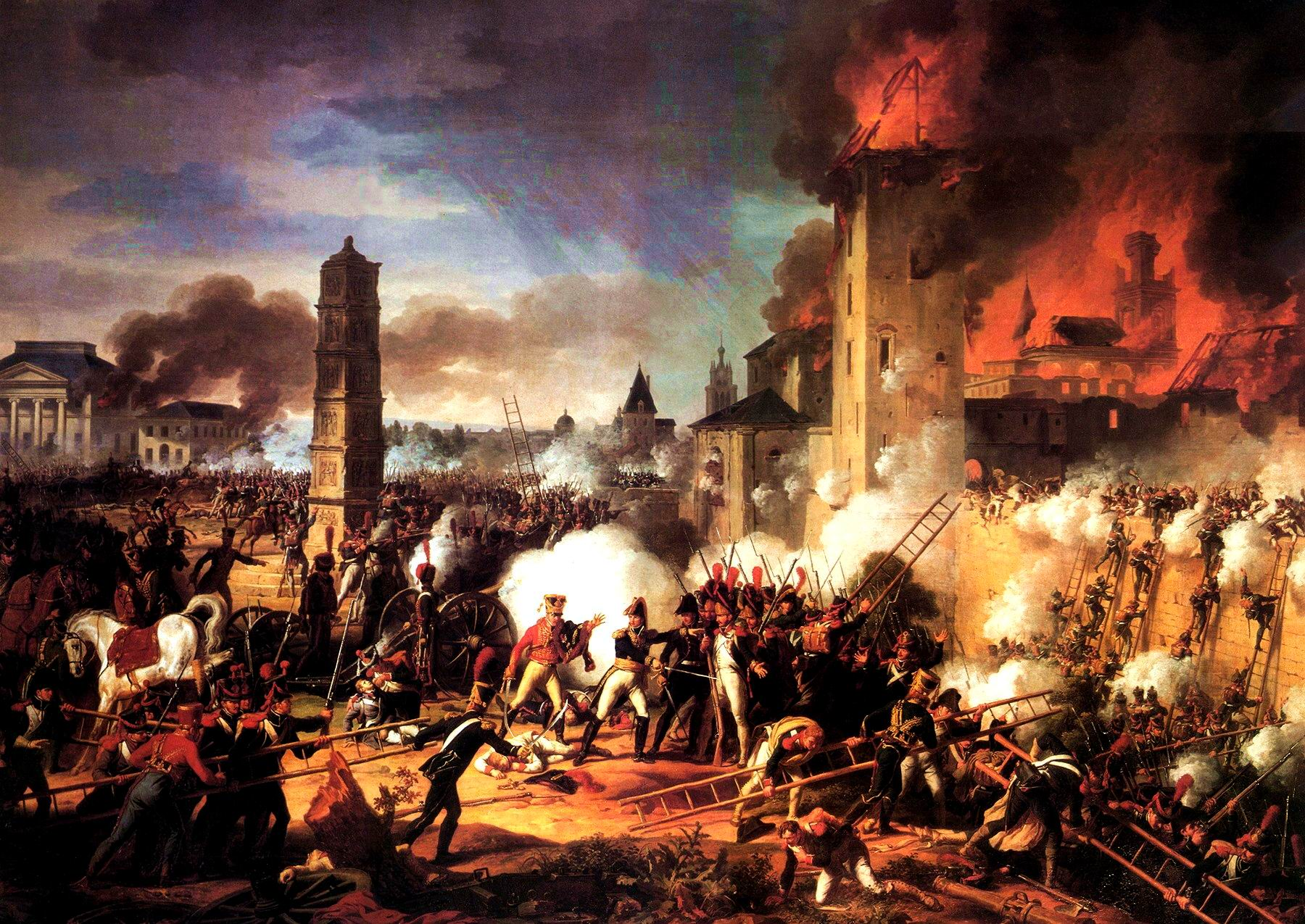
The Storming of the Citadel of Ratisbon by Charles Thévenin

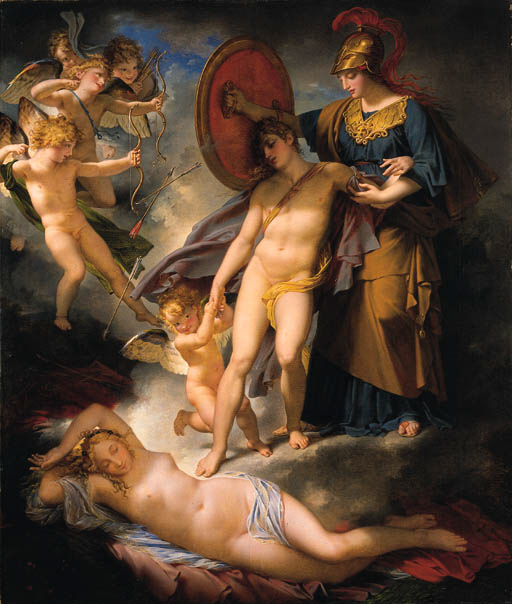
Wisdom Defending Youth Against Love by Charles Meynier

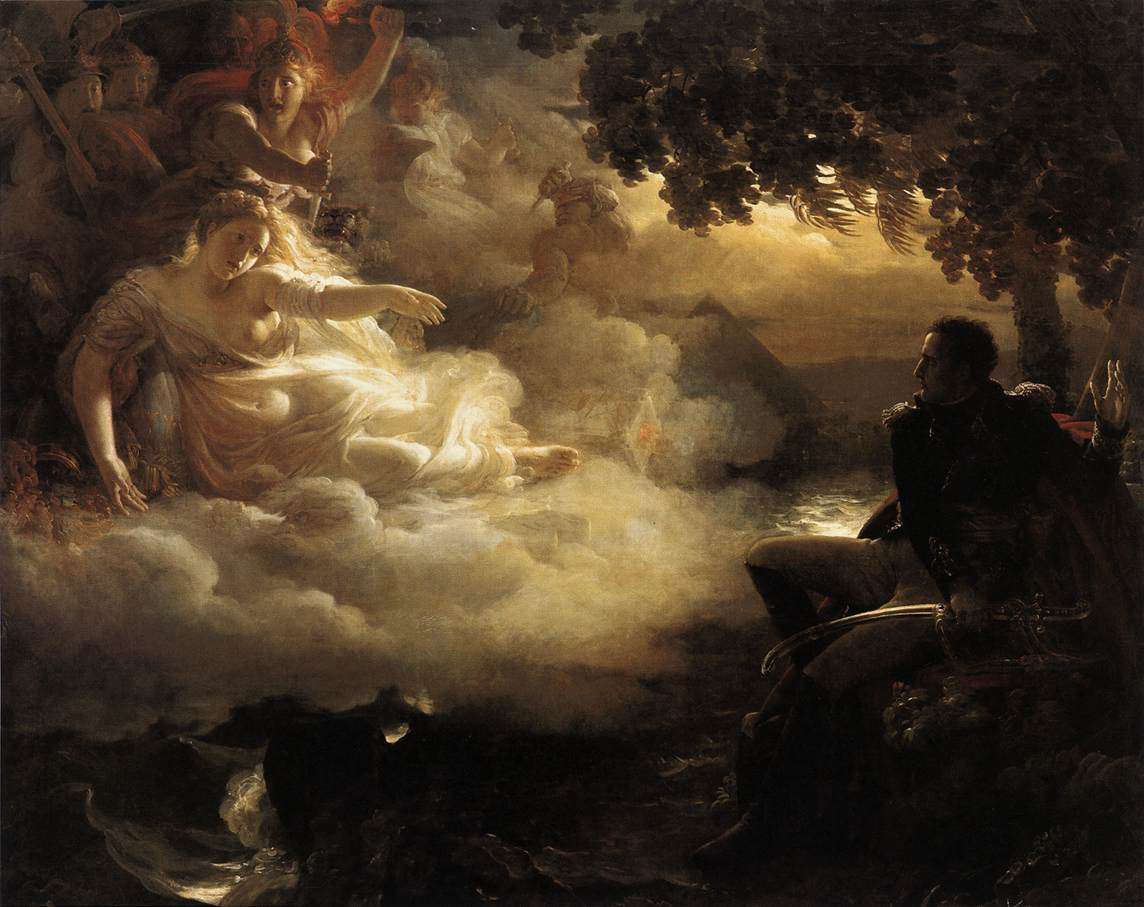
Allegory of France Before the Return of Napoleon from Egypt by Jean-Pierre Franque

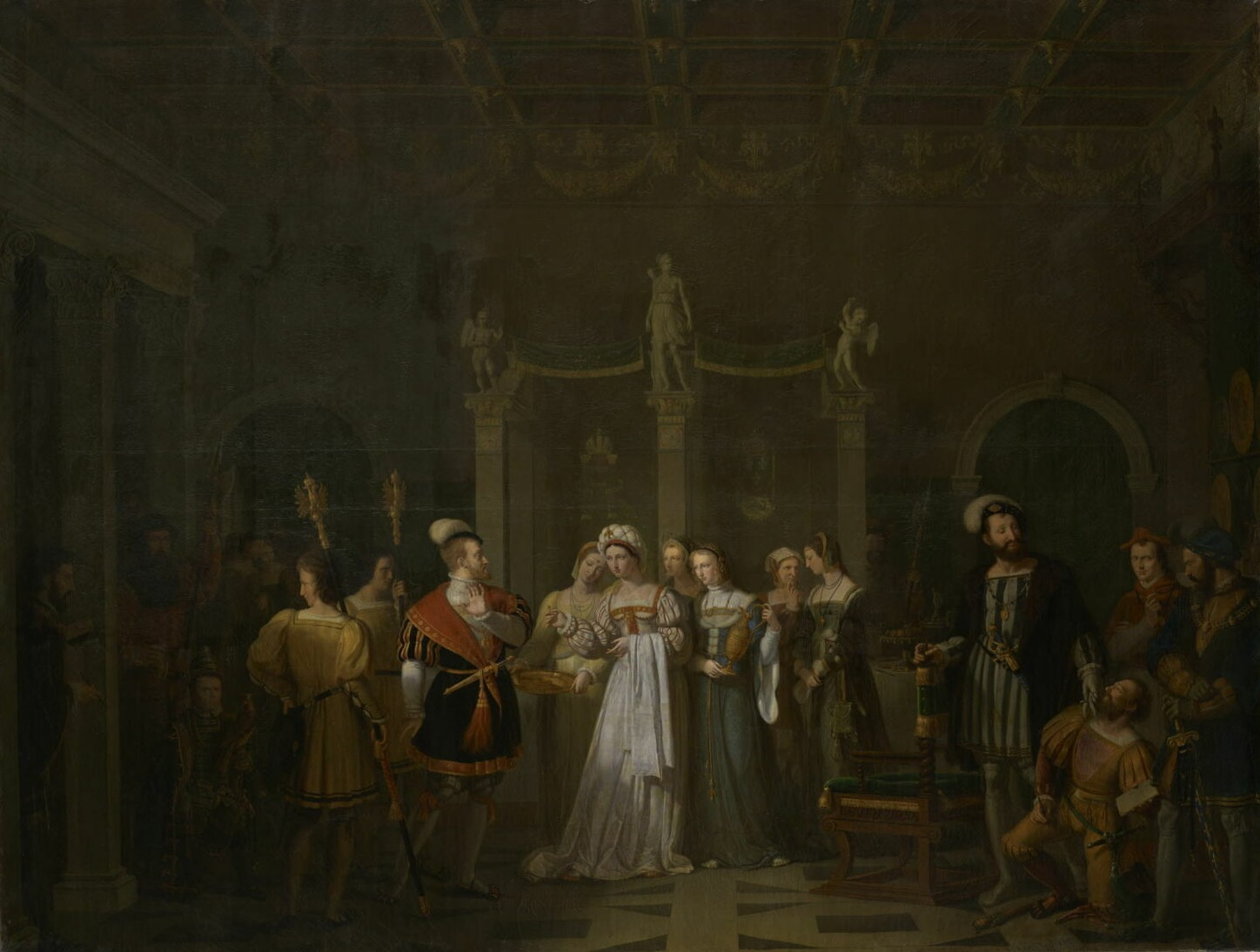
L'Anneau de l'empereur Charles Quint by Pierre Révoil

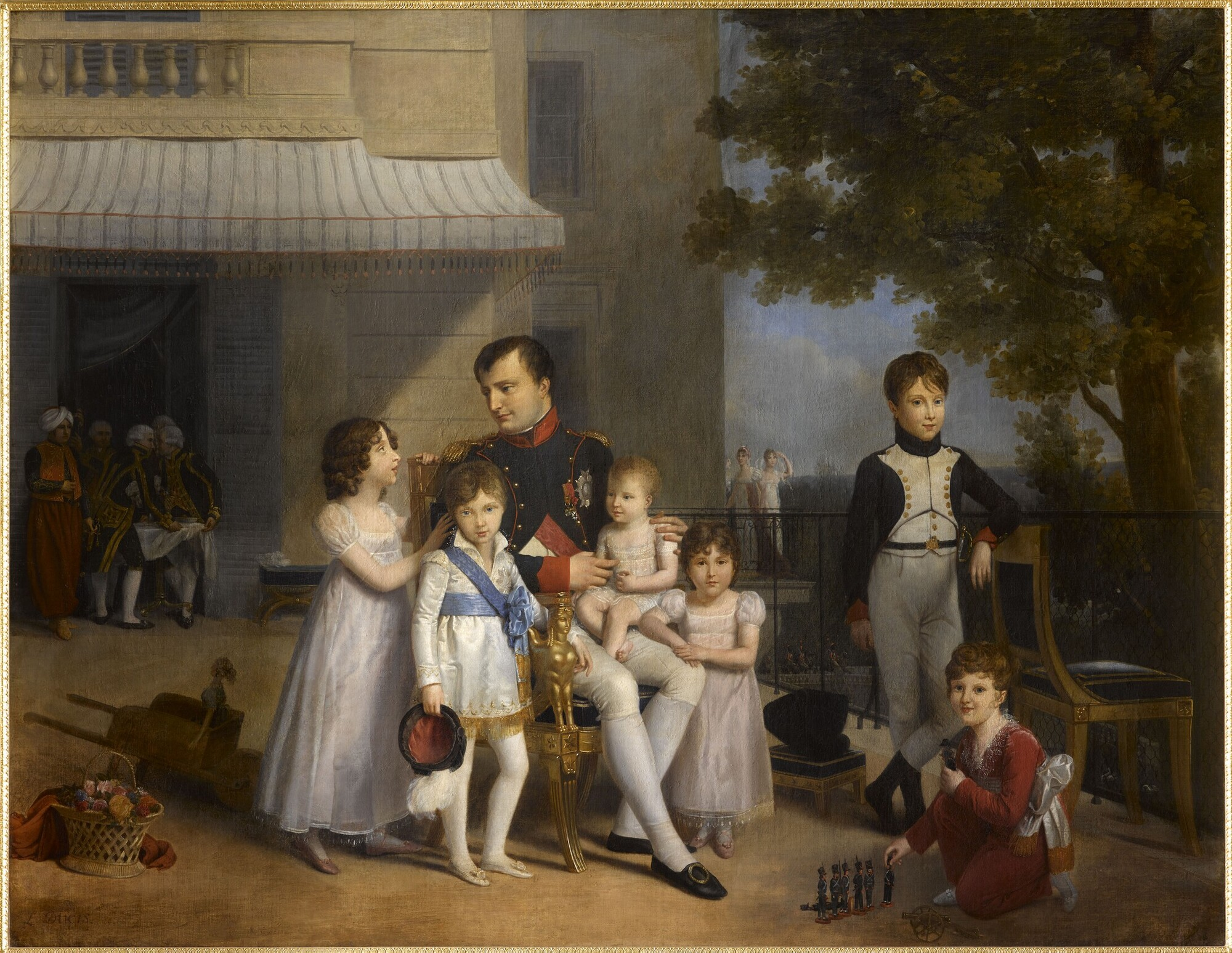
Napoléon sur la terrasse de Saint-Cloud by Louis Ducis

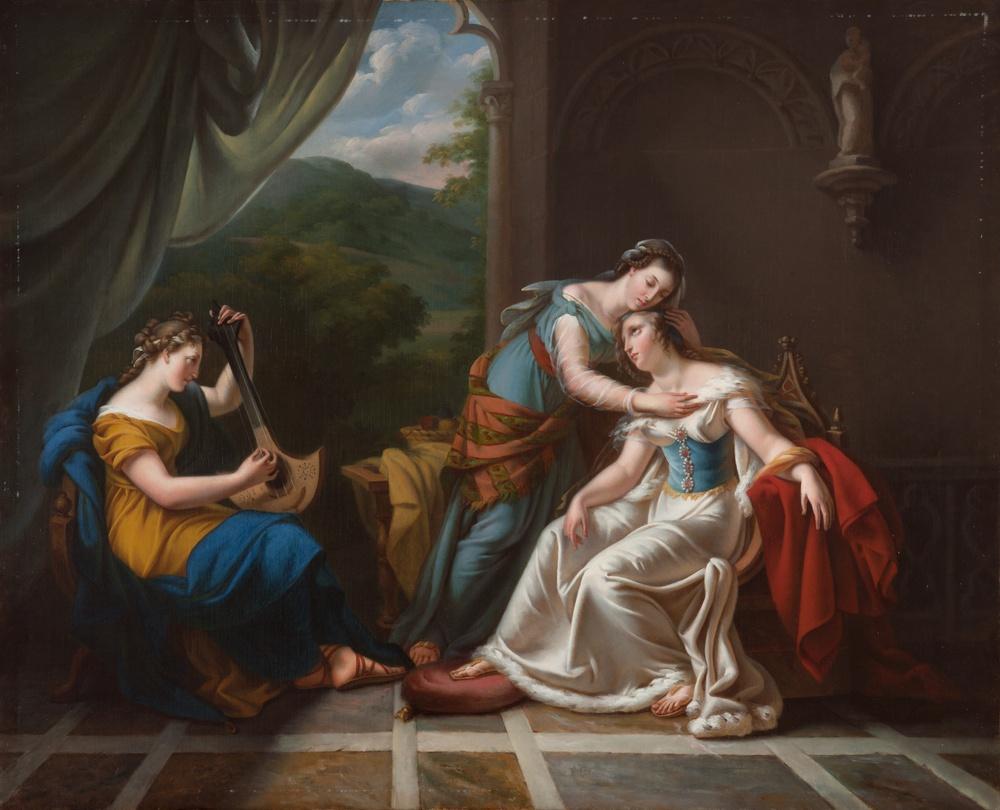
Malvina. Song of Sorrow on the Loss of Her Dear Oscar (Ossian) by Alexandrine Delaval

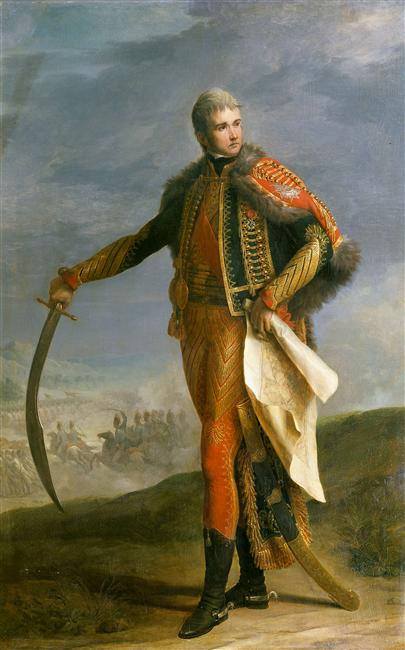
Portrait of Jean Lannes by Jean-Charles Nicaise Perrin

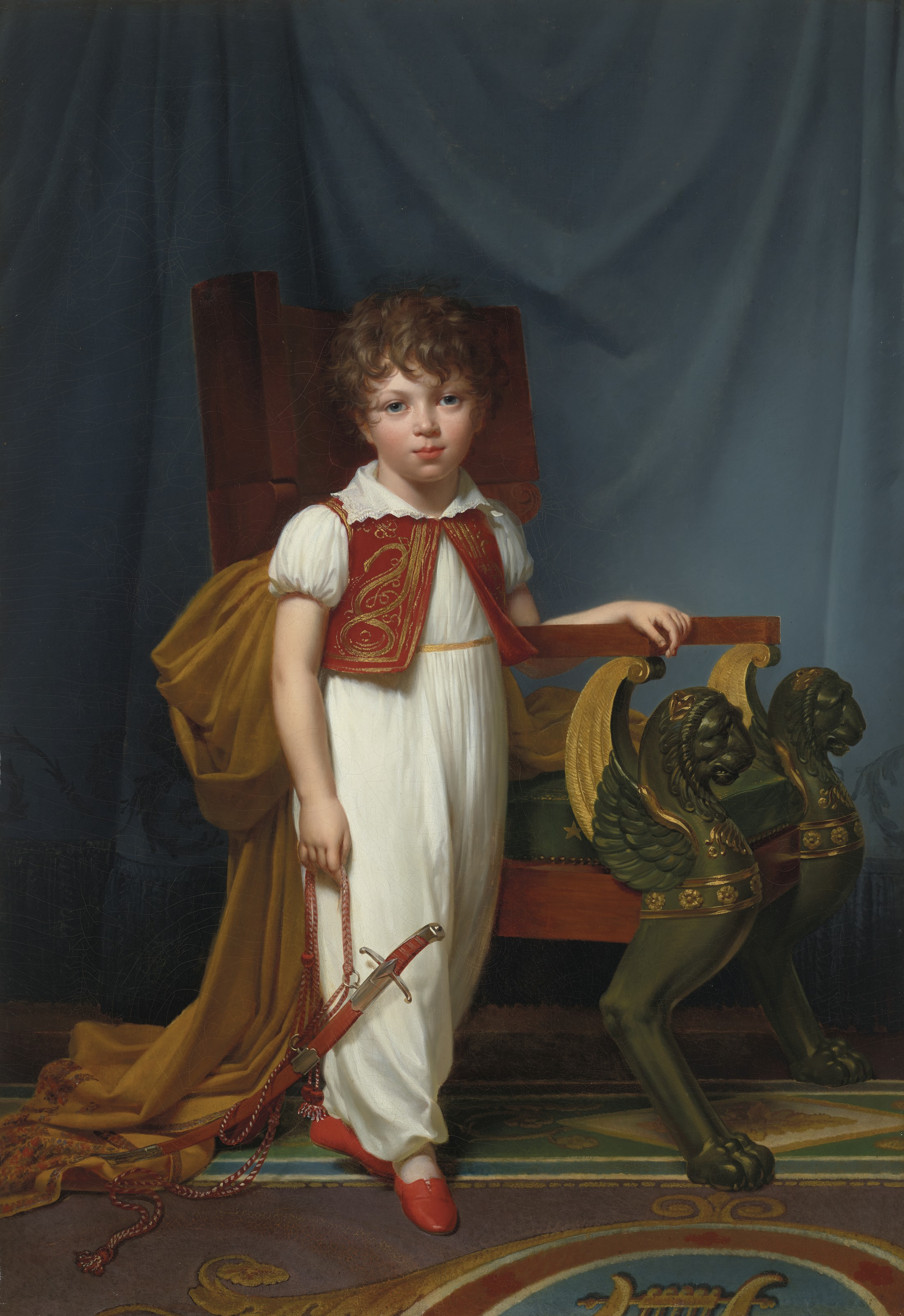
Portrait of Eugene Isabey by Louis-Andre-Gabriel Bouchet

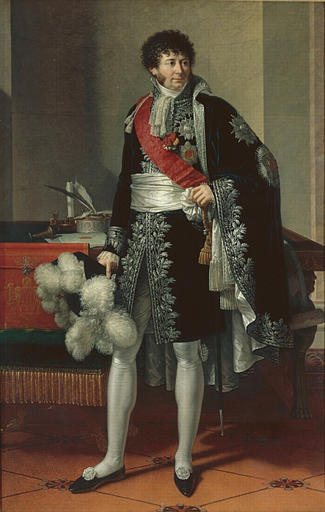
Portrait of Henri Jacques Guillaume Clarke by François-Xavier Fabre

== Bibliography ==
- DeLorme, Eleanor P. Joséphine and the Arts of the Empire. Getty Publications, 2005.
- Draper, James David & Scherf, Guilhem. Playing with Fire: European Terracotta Models, 1740-1840. Metropolitan Museum of Art, 2004.
- Gildea, Robert. Children of the Revolution: The French, 1799-1914. Harvard University Press, 2008.

== See also ==
- Category:Artworks exhibited at the Salon of 1810
