= Battle of Ratisbon =

1809 battle of the War of the Fifth Coalition

- Part of the War of the Fifth Coalition
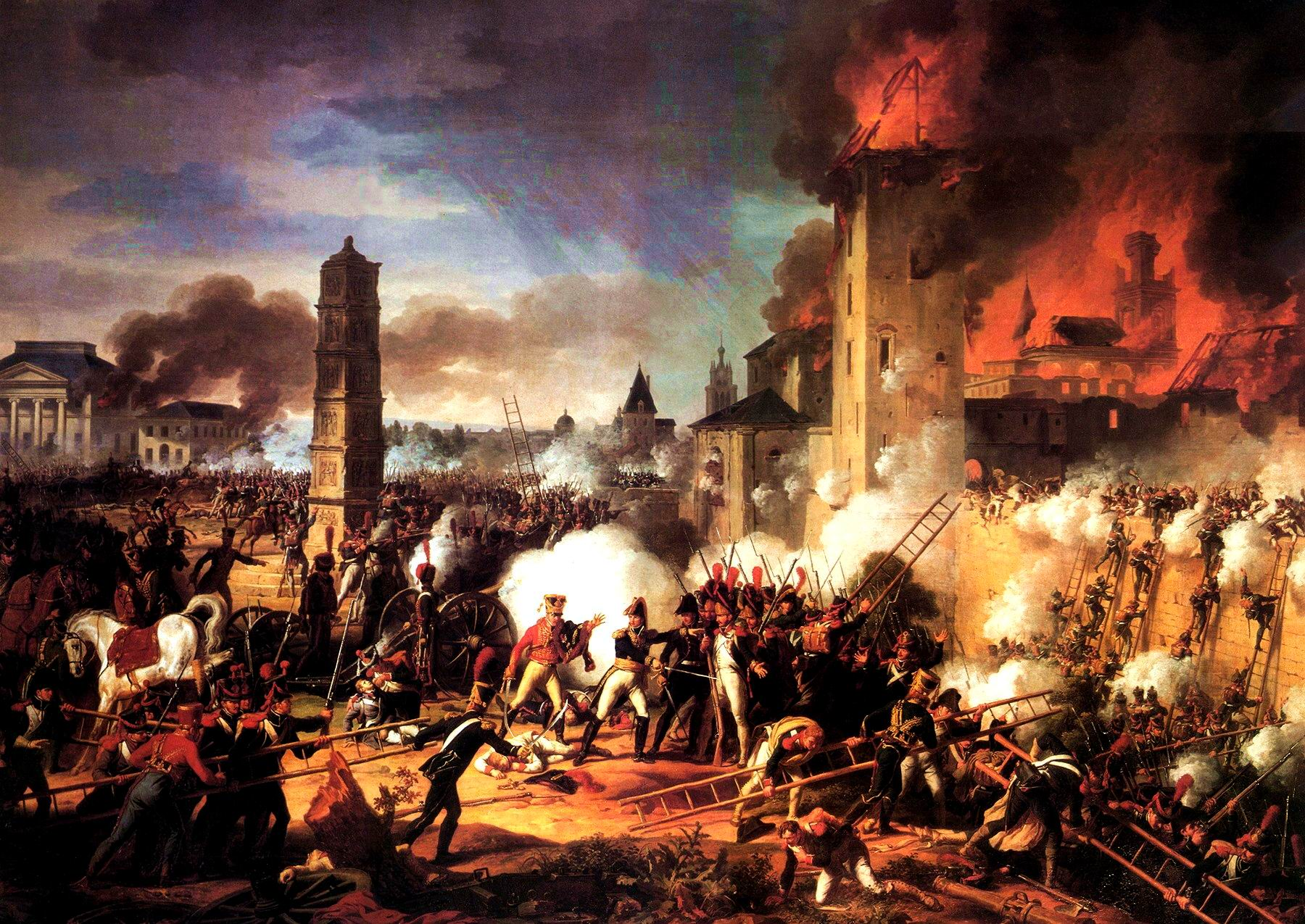
- Marshal Lannes leads the storming of the citadel at the Battle of Ratisbon, as painted by Charles Thévenin.
Date	23 April 1809
Location	Regensburg, Principality of Regensburg 49°1′N 12°5′E
Result	French victory

Belligerents
(First French Empire) French Empire	Austrian Empire

Commanders and leaders
Napoleon I (WIA); Jean Lannes; Louis-Nicolas Davout	(Austrian Empire) Archduke Charles

Strength
72,000	47,000 in battle 78,000 in total

Casualties and losses
1,000–2,000 dead or wounded	8,000–8,900, including 6,000 captured
- Location within Europe

War of the Fifth Coalition
current battle
Napoleon in command
Napoleon not in command

The Battle of Ratisbon, also called the Battle of Regensburg, was a meeting engagement fought on 23 April 1809, during the Napoleonic Wars, between the army of the French Empire, led by Napoleon I, and that of the Austrian Empire, led by Archduke Charles. Scene of the last engagement of the Bavaria phase of the campaign of 1809, the brief defense of the city and installation of a pontoon bridge to the east enabled the retreating Austrian army to escape into Bohemia. During the assault, Marshal Jean Lannes led his troops up ladders onto the walls, and Napoleon was wounded in his ankle by a small artillery round. The shot had been fired at great distance and did not severely hurt the Emperor, but caused a contusion.

== Prelude ==
Following his victory at Eckmühl on 22 April Napoleon summoned his first ever council of war, which decided to halt the army about 18 kilometers south of the city of Ratisbon (which the Austrians had captured two days earlier).

That night, the main Austrian army (I–IV Korps and I Reserve Korps) began moving its heavy equipment over the city’s vital stone bridge over the Danube, while a pontoon bridge was thrown 2 kilometers downstream to the east for the troops. Five battalions from II Korps defended the city, while 6,000 cavalry and some infantry battalions held the hilly ground outside.

== Battle ==
At dawn on 23 April the French advance continued in a pincer movement toward Ratisbon, with General Louis-Pierre Montbrun coming from the southwest and Napoleon moving up from the south. Around 9:00 am, 10,000 French cavalry, led by General Étienne Nansouty’s two cuirassier divisions, began to engage the Austrian cavalry, who despite poorly coordinated charges were able to hold them for almost three hours to facilitate the army’s escape, before they slipped away.

Only then did the French discover the pontoon bridge, but its last defenders were able to hold on and cut the securing ropes to prevent the French from using it.

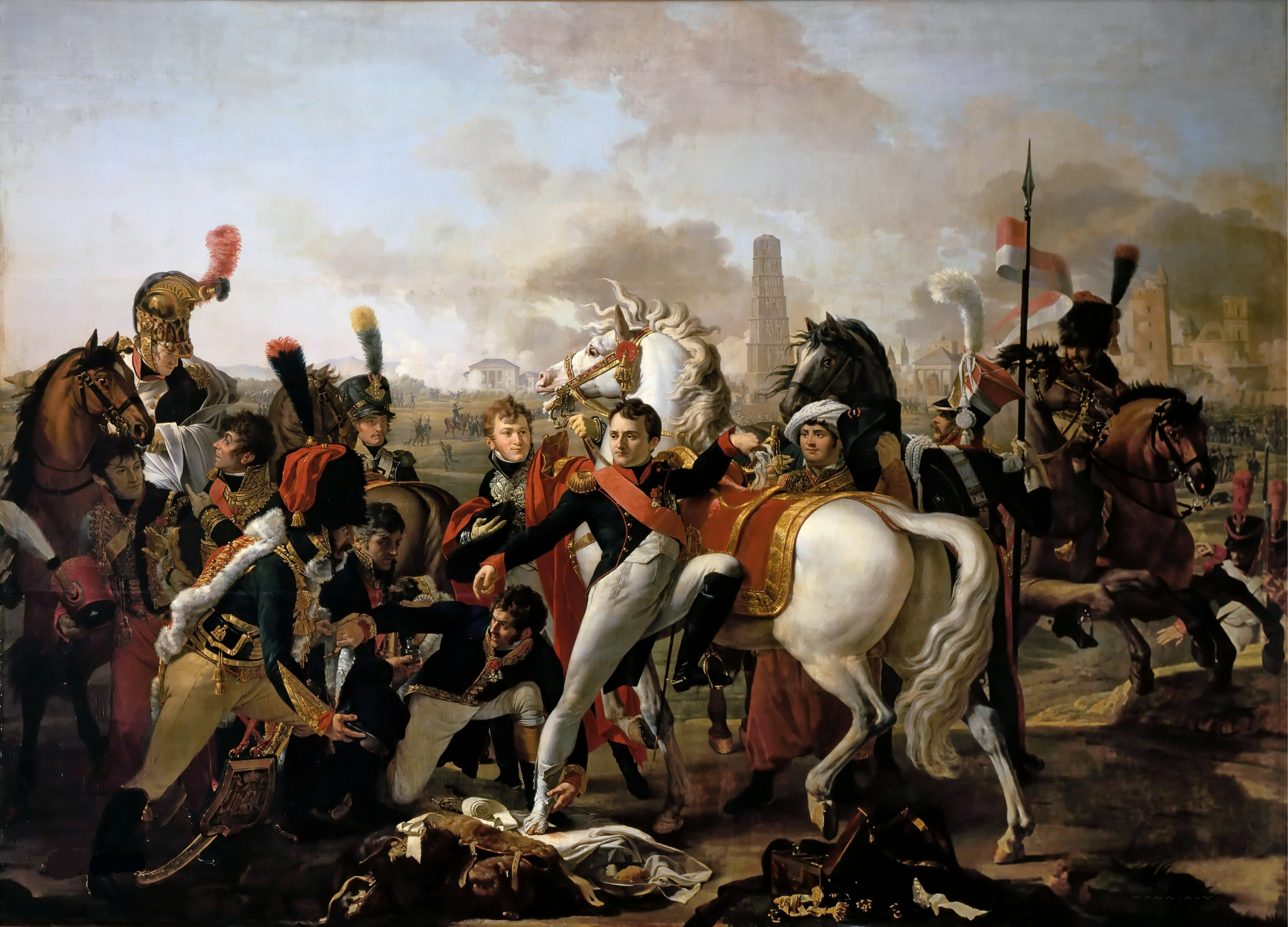
Napoleon Wounded at Ratisbon by Claude Gautherot, 1810

By noon the French infantry had arrived and formed up around the city’s medieval defenses. Lannes was given charge of its capture and opened up an artillery bombardment, while light infantry engaged the Austrian troops in the suburbs. Two infantry assaults on the main gates had already failed with heavy losses, when at 3:00 P.M. General Henri Gatien Bertrand, head of the engineers, smashed a breach in the wall with heavy artillery near the Straubing gate.

Walking to observe the gap, Napoleon was struck by a small canister round in the left foot but was able to mount his horse and ride around, reassuring his anxious troops. Three small parties with siege ladders failed to scale the damaged wall.

Lannes' men could not bring themselves to advance into the maelstrom a fourth time and so, exasperated, Lannes grabbed a scaling ladder and renewed his appeal. Then, amid an embarrassed silence, he angrily shouted: "I will let you see that I was a grenadier before I was a marshal and still am one." He took the ladder and moved forwards, but was physically restrained by his aides. His troops, shamed into action by the despair of their leader, rushed forward. The fourth assault party carried the walls and within minutes French troops were pouring into the now-doomed Ratisbon.

A street-by-street battle raged for several hours until the French could secure and begin looting the southern part of the city. The bridge was determinedly defended by the 1st battalion of Infanterie Regiment 15 from the northern gatehouse until around 9:00 P.M., when they abandoned their positions and the French could reach the northern suburb of Stadt-am-Hof. The last 300 defenders surrendered soon after.

== Consequences ==
French casualties, including a wounded-in-the-ankle Bonaparte, were between 1,500 and 2,000 while the Austrians lost at least 6,000 men killed, injured or captured. Sending Marshal Louis Davout to guard the north bank across the Danube, Bonaparte was now free to move on Vienna leading to the Battle of Aspern-Essling.

== In literature ==
Robert Browning's poem "Incident of the French Camp" describes a probably fictional incident during the battle.

== Notes ==
Preceded by Battle of Eckmühl	Napoleonic Wars; Battle of Ratisbon	Succeeded by Battle of Neumarkt-Sankt Veit
