= Battle of Austerlitz, 2 December 1805 (Gérard) =

1810 painting by François Gérard

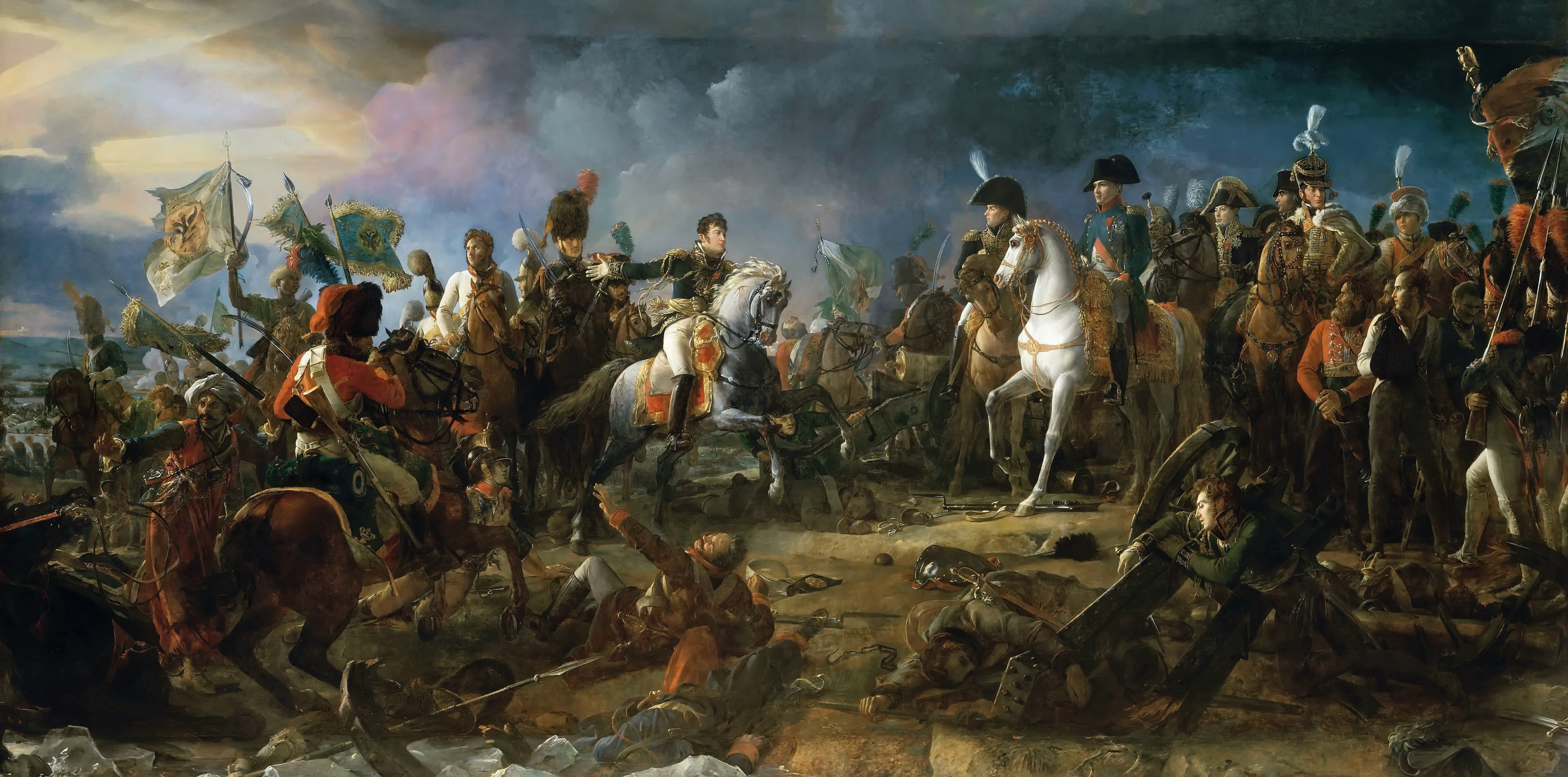
- Artist: François Gérard
- Year: 1810
- Medium: oil on canvas
- Dimensions: 510 cm × 958 cm (200 in × 377 in)
- Location: Palace of Versailles, Versailles

Battle Of Austerlitz, 2 December 1805 is an oil-on-canvas painting by the French painter François Gérard from 1810. The painting depicts the moment at the conclusion of the Battle of Austerlitz in which the French General Jean Rapp presents to Napoleon Bonaparte the captured Prince Repnin, commander of the Russian Imperial Guard, signifying the victory of Napoleon's army over the combined forces of Russia and Austria. One of three paintings commissioned by Napoleon following the victory, Gérard's work stands out as the sole history painting, highlighting the bravery of the French guard (Grande Armée) and modesty of its leader. It is currently displayed in the Gallery of the Battles, at the Palace of Versailles.

== Historical context ==
Gérard was commissioned to create the large canvas in 1806. It was originally meant to decorate the ceiling of the Conseil d’État (French State Council). The painting was shown for the first time at the Paris Salon of 1810, two years later than planned.

This painting was created during a pivotal period of French history in which art often engaged with politics, serving as propaganda for the Napoleonic Empire. Gérard's depiction of Napoleon's victory at the Battle of Austerlitz helped to enhance the Emperor's reputation as a military genius and unifier of the European continent. The painting was carefully illustrated to flatter Napoleon. The primary focus of the scene is the victory of the French troops, not the defeat of the enemy troops, thus highlighting the Emperor's modesty and bravery of the army.

François Gérard, the painting's creator

Gérard's personal and professional circumstances also reflect the historical context of early 19th century France. He experienced financial struggles during Revolutionary times but ultimately found success under Napoleonic rule as a portraitist for the Imperial family. The Battle of Austerlitz earned him 40,000 francs. His commission highlights the growing opportunities for artists of this time who aligned their interests with the regime.

The work, despite its title, does not focus on the battle of Austerlitz itself. The decision to depict a moment following the battle aligned with theoretical writing on history painting from the period, which described battles themselves as not suitably dignified for the grand genre. The choice of moment may also reflect the political needs of the period, when France sought to cultivate Russia as an ally, not treat it merely as a defeated enemy.

The scene is set on the plateau of Pratzen, where the French guard got through Russian lines and successfully set the trap that Napoleon had planned. The frozen lakes of Sokolnitz where the Russian army had fled, then fell through the ice that cracked under French bombardment, is suggested the background. The left side of the painting illustrates the French Guard led by General Rapp, carrying seized flags and surrounding the captured Russian Prince Repnin (dressed in white). To the right, Napoleon (dressed in blue) sits confidently on his horse, surrounded by well-dressed Generals and other prisoners. From the left corner of the painting, the mythical "sun of Austerlitz" seems to illuminate the scene, conforming to another part of the Napoleonic legend. In the field of the battle lie several injured or dead soldiers.

== Composition and analysis ==
François Gérard balanced the two halves of the composition while adhering to the unity of action, an essential principle of history painting. The single, cohesive moment of General Rapp presenting Prince Repnin avoids the depiction of multiple events occurring at once that is often seen in the genre of war painting. The composition represents a broad and complicated form of the late Neoclassical art style that was common during the Napoleonic era. Many historians assume that it was designed in the style of Antoine-Jean Gros, a prominent Romantic painter of the time who also painted historical subjects. Like Gros, Gérard was also a student of Jacques-Louis David.

Utilizing a binary composition allowed Gérard to divide the scene into two groups of characters. Scanning the painting from left to right, viewers first visualize the subjects surrounding General Rapp and Repnin and then Napoleon and his officers on the right. The division of the two groups heightens the drama of the scene as Rapp's emphatic gesture, pointing to the Russian prisoners, contrasts with Napoleon's impassivity. The Emperor's calm demeanor symbolizes his leadership and collectedness amidst the violence and chaos of war while General Rapp represents the action and greatness of the moment.

Lighting and color also play a significant role in directing the narrative focus and creating emotional depth in the painting. The "sun of Austerlitz" that illuminates the painting emphasizes the symbolic significance of December 2 in the Napoleonic epic. The focus points of the image, General Rapp and Napoleon, stand out as the sunlight is directed on their bodies and horses. They are also easily distinguishable by the light color of their mounts. The warmness of the sunset also contrasts the light blue hues of the rising smoke in the background and enhances the canvas. The art historian David O'Brien notes that Gérard received instruction from Vivant Denon, a French diplomat, to emphasize the magnificence of the outfits of the officers surrounding Napoleon to make the emperor stand out in his simplicity.

Gérard's refusal to illustrate gore or overly violent combat ensures that the painting conformed to the period's standards of decorum, a fact that drew admiration from critics. The illustration of injured and dead soldiers in the painting is very limited and the misfortunes of war are displayed in their most touching, not horrifying aspects. Other details, like the poignancy of the wounded soldiers unable to express joy in response to General Rapp's announcement, add a humanizing touch to the scene. Finally, Gérard structures the narrative energy of the painting like a crescendo at Napoleon's feet and accentuates the symbolic power of the scene by directing the intense, raking light upon the Emperor and his horse against a relatively dark ground.

== Location ==
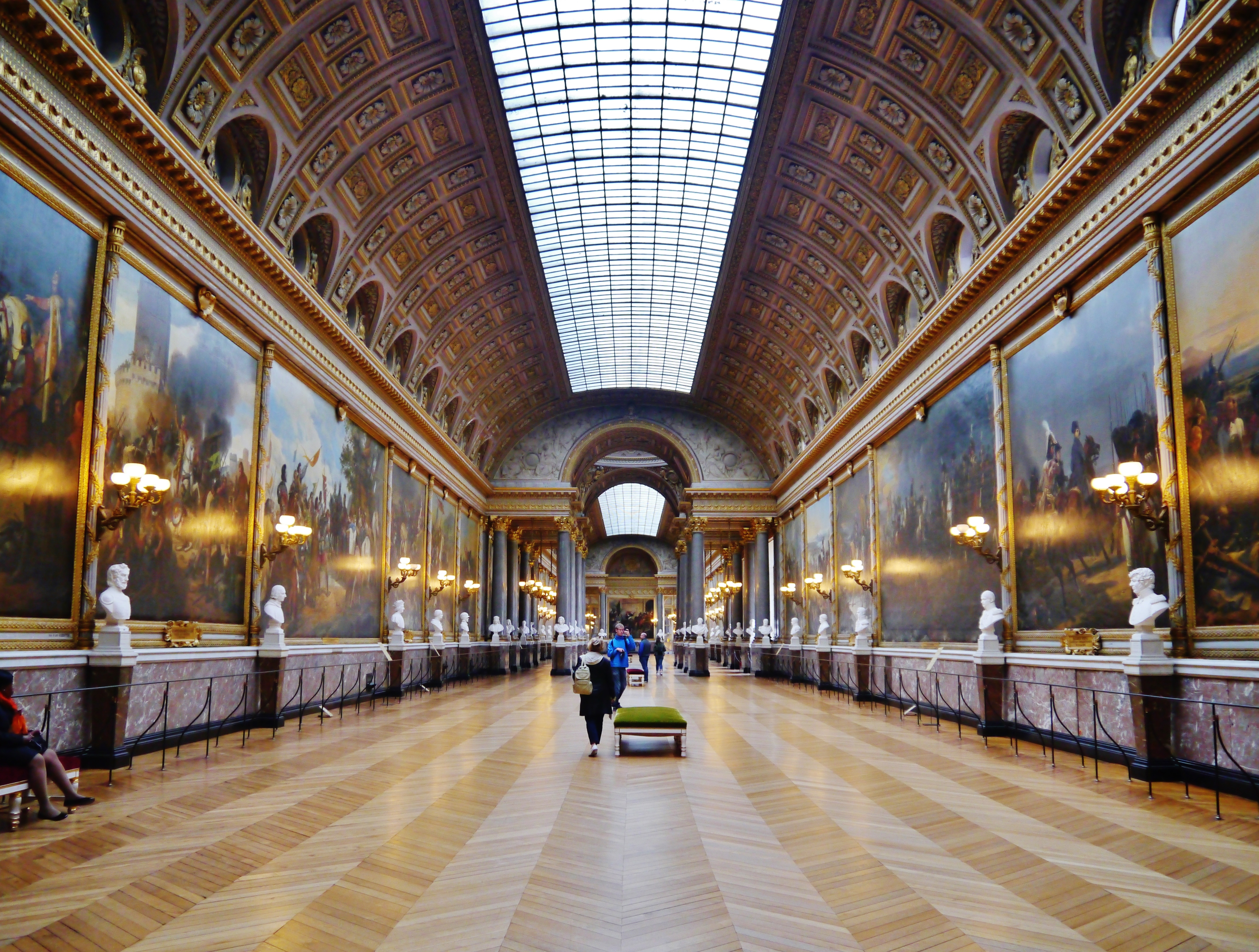
Galerie des Batailles (Gallery of Battles) - Versailles, France

In 1833, King Louis-Philippe I of France decided to convert the Palace of Versailles into a historical museum of France. The Galerie des Batailles (Gallery of the Battles) was inaugurated in 1837. In the gallery, 33 monumental canvases where displayed, depicting military episodes throughout the history of France. Gérard's canvas has been shown there since.
