= Portrait of Chateaubriand =

Painting by Anne-Louis Girodet de Roussy-Trioson

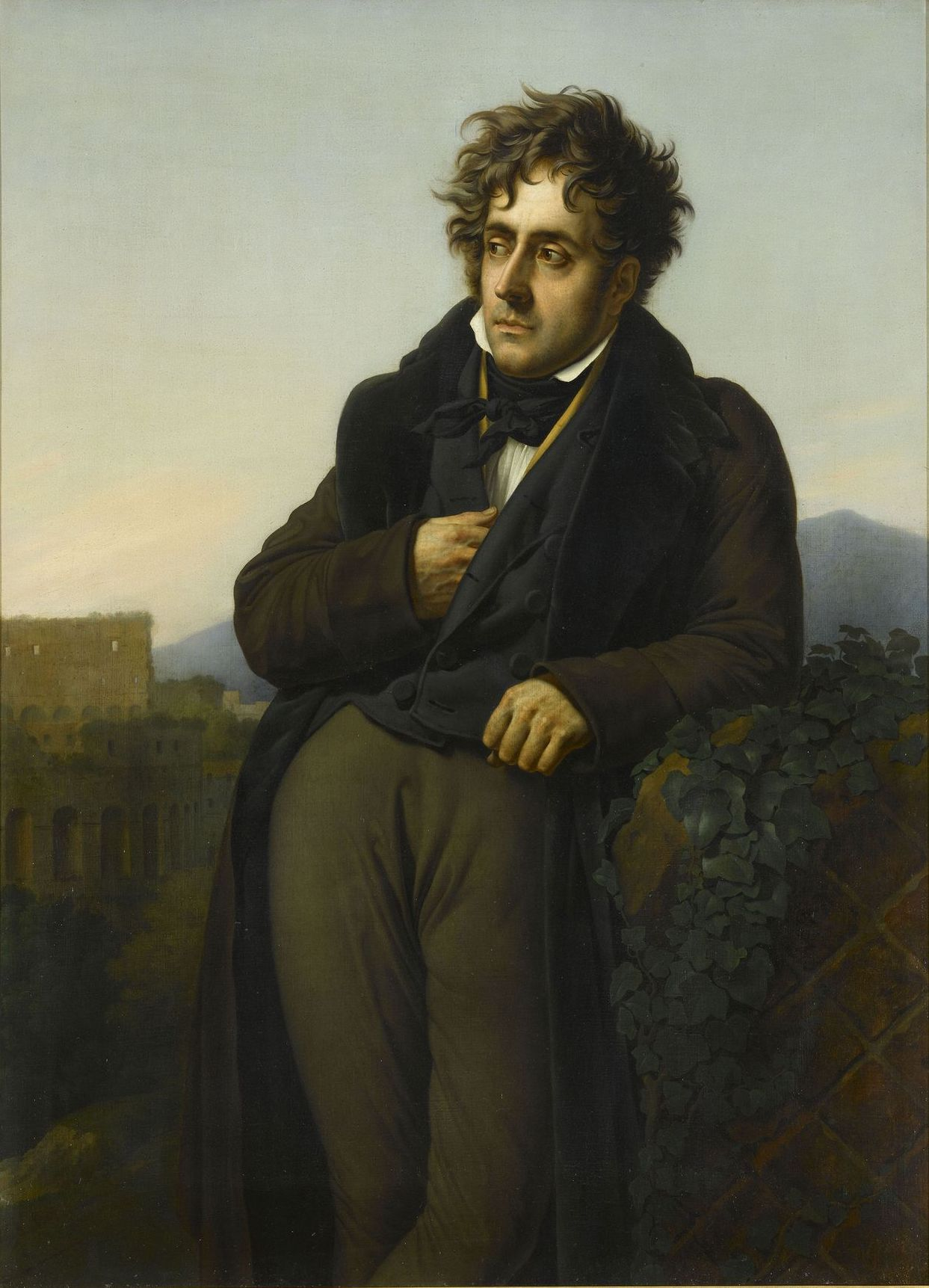
- Artist: Anne-Louis Girodet de Roussy-Trioson
- Year: 1809
- Type: Oil on canvas, portrait
- Dimensions: 120 cm × 96 cm (47 in × 38 in)
- Location: Musée d’Histoire, Saint-Malo

Portrait of Chateaubriand is a c.1809 portrait painting by the French artist Anne-Louis Girodet de Roussy-Trioson. It depicts the French statesman and author François-René de Chateaubriand. Closely associated with the Conservative movement against the French Revolution, he served as Foreign Minister from 1822 to 1824 during the Restoration Era at the time of the Spanish Expedition.

Chateaubriand is shown in a melancholy stance with the ruins of Ancient Rome behind him, during an 1804 visit. The windswept Chateaubriand gazing at the ruins of the Colosseum became an evocative image of the early Romantic male ideal. It was exhibited at the Salon of 1810. Today the painting is in the Musée d’Histoire of Saint-Malo in Brittany.

== Bibliography ==
- Murray, Christopher John. Encyclopedia of the Romantic Era, 1760–1850, Volume 2. Taylor & Francis, 2004.
- Painter, George Duncan. Chateaubriand: A Biography. Knopf, 1978.
