= Nikolai Repnin-Volkonsky =

Russian general and governor (1778–1845)

Prince Nikolai Repnin-Volkonsky
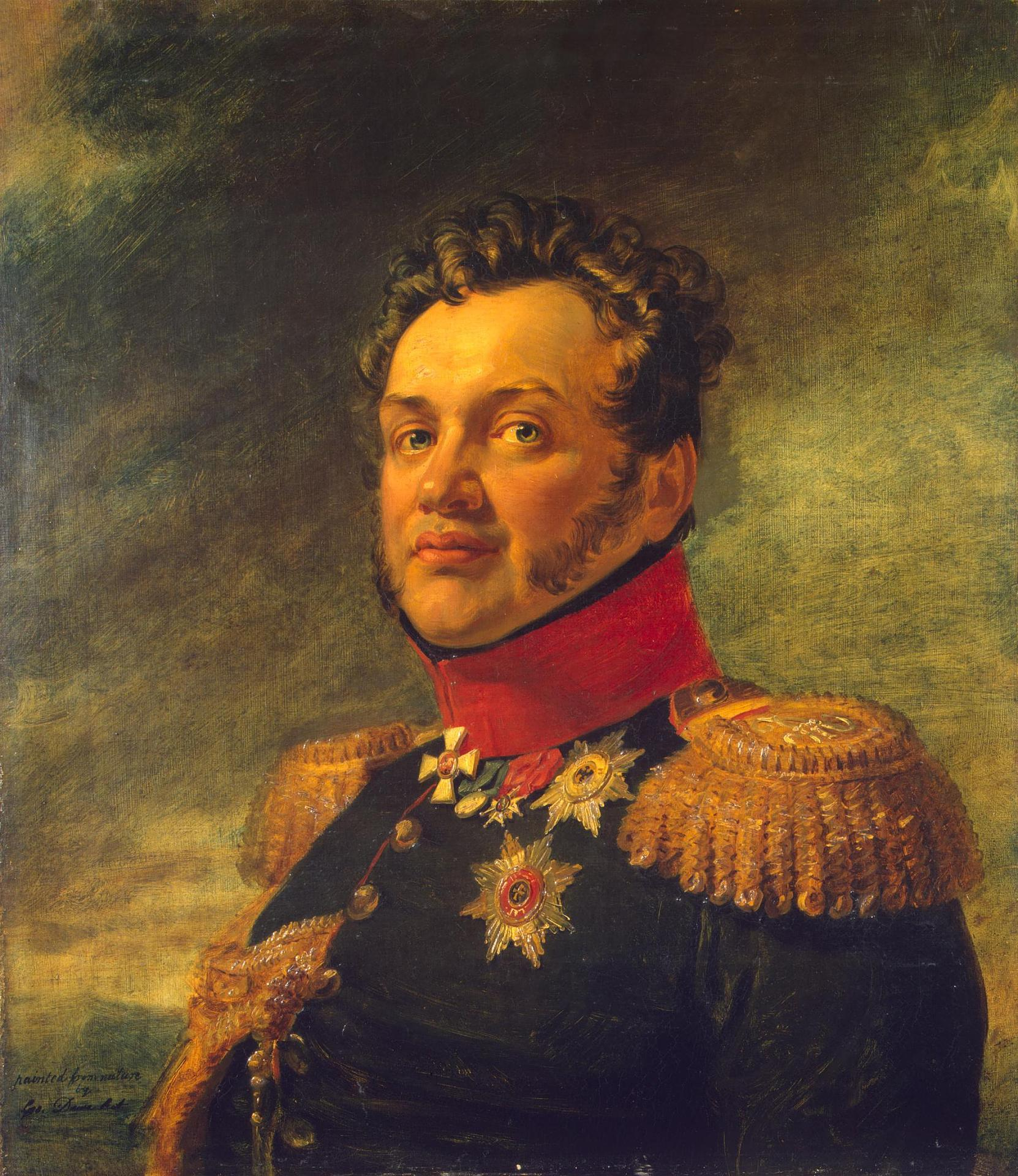
- Portrait by George Dawe, 1820–1825
- Born: 1778
- Died: 18 January 1845 (aged 67); Yagotin, Russian Empire
- Military career
- Allegiance: Russia
- Branch: Imperial Russian Army
- Rank: General

Prince Nikolai Grigoryevich Repnin-Volkonsky (Russian: Николай Григорьевич Репнин-Волконский; 1778 – 18 January [O.S. 6 January] 1845) was a general in the Imperial Russian Army.

== Life ==
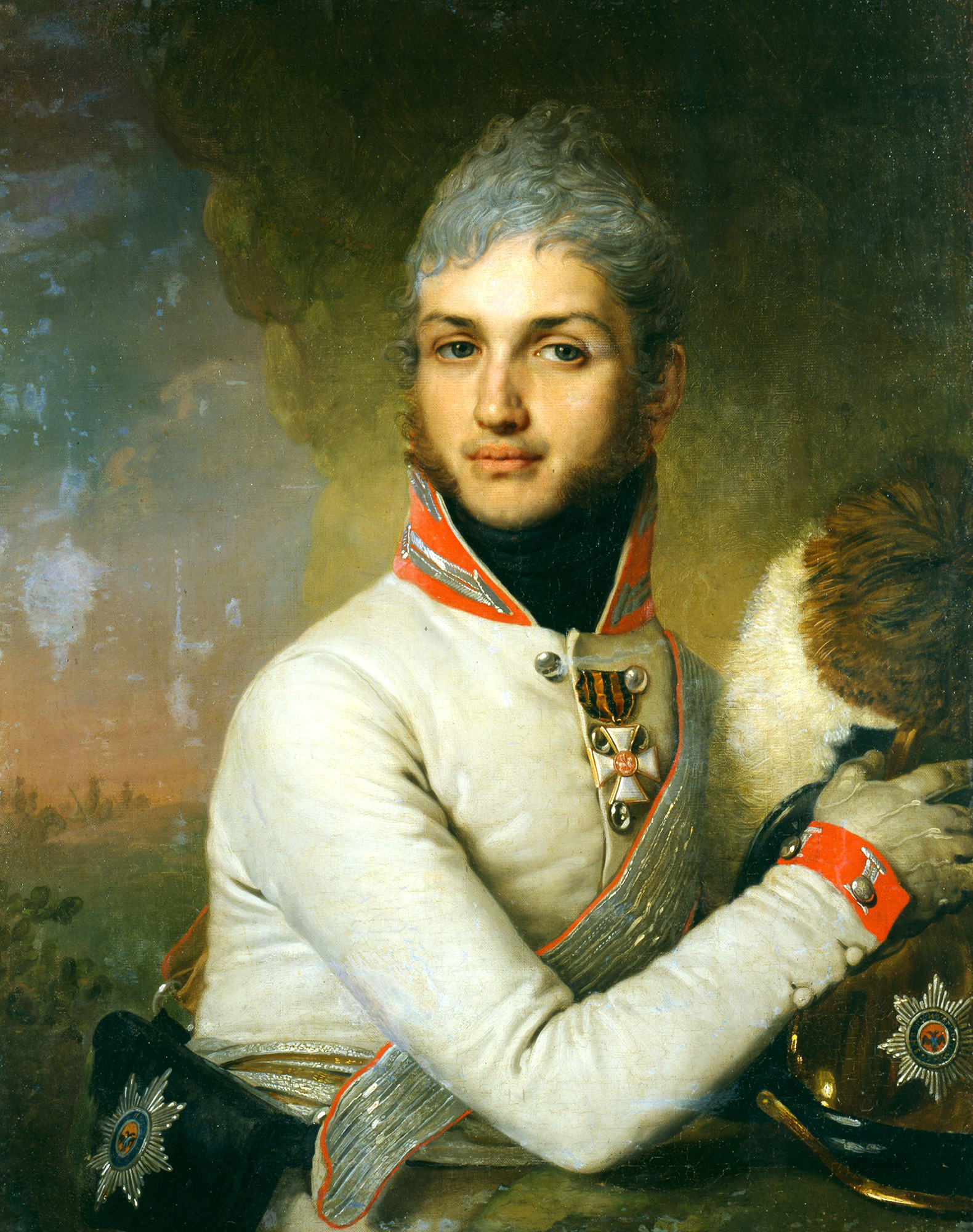
Portrait of Repnin-Volkonsky by Vladimir Borovikovsky, 1806

He was the son of General Prince Grigory Semyonovich Volkonsky of the Volkonsky noble family, but the adoptive son of his maternal grandfather Nicholas Repnin. He joined the Russian Imperial Guard before taking up a colonelcy in the Chevalier Guard Regiment during the campaign against the French. He was captured at the Battle of Austerlitz (this being depicted in François Gérard's painting Battle of Austerlitz) and only freed after the Peace of Tilsit. He was promoted to major general and was made ambassador to the Kingdom of Westphalia in 1809 and to Spain in 1810. In 1809, he was elected an honorary member of the Göttingen Academy of Sciences.

He returned to Russia in 1811, and a year later, was put in command of a cavalry regiment in the army department commanded by Peter Wittgenstein. In October 1813, after the Battle of Leipzig, he became military governor in Saxony, until being replaced by the Prussian General Government in November 1814. During this period he worked to stabilise and rebuilt Saxony and attempted to turn its capital Dresden into the centre of German art, commissioning the external staircase to Brühl's Terrace and opening the Großer Garten to the public. He also put up a monument on the Räcknitzhöhe near Dresden to the wounding of Jean-Victor Moreau.

He took part in the Hundred Days campaign and the Congress of Vienna. In 1816, he became governor of Poltava, and in 1835, a member of the State Council.

He died on 18 January [O.S. 6 January] 1845 at his estate of Yagotin.

== Sources ==
- "Репнин-Волконский, Николай Григорьевич" . Brockhaus and Efron Encyclopedic Dictionary (in Russian). 1906.
