= The Passage of the Danube by Napoleon Before the Battle of Wagram =

Painting by Jacques François Joseph Swebach-Desfontaines

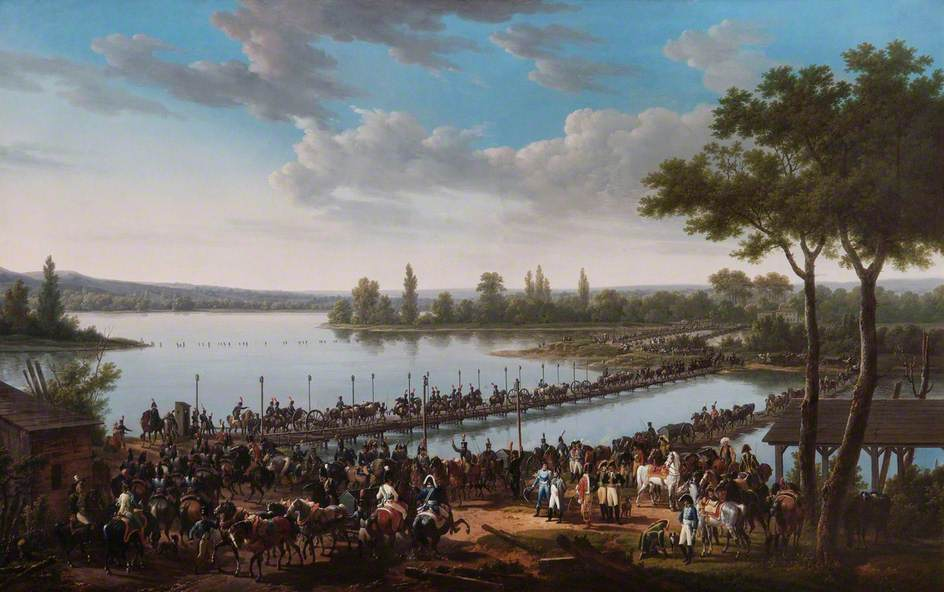
- Artist: Jacques François Joseph Swebach-Desfontaines
- Year: 1810
- Type: Oil on canvas, history painting
- Dimensions: 80.5 cm × 128.5 cm (31.7 in × 50.6 in)
- Location: Apsley House; London

The Passage of the Danube by Napoleon Before the Battle of Wagram is an 1810 history painting by the French artist Jacques François Joseph Swebach-Desfontaines. It depicts the opening of the Battle of Wagram, a notable victory for the French Emperor Napoleon. Fought in July 1809 during the Napoleonic Wars, the crossing of the Danube River on newly created bridge enabled France to gain a hard-fought victory over the Austrian Empire. Austria's defeat led to the collapse of the Fifth Coalition against France with the signing of the Treaty of Schönbrunn.

It was exhibited at the Salon of 1810 at the Louvre in Paris where it was one of the major attractions. Many years later the Duke of Wellington, who had defeated Napoleon at the Battle of Waterloo, acquired the depiction of the victory of his former opponent. It was one of a number of portrayals of Napoleon he acquired. Today it remains in the collection at Apsley House, Wellington's former residence in London.

== See also ==
- The Battle of Wagram, an 1836 painting by Horace Vernet

== Bibliography ==
- Jervis, Simon & Tomlin, Maurice. Apsley House, Wellington Museum. Victoria and Albert Museum, 1997.
- Roberts, Andrew. Napoleon and Wellington; The Battle of Waterloo and the Great Commanders who Fought it. Simon and Schuster, 2002.
