= The Wedding of Jérôme Bonaparte and Catherine of Württemberg =

Painting by Jean-Baptiste Regnault

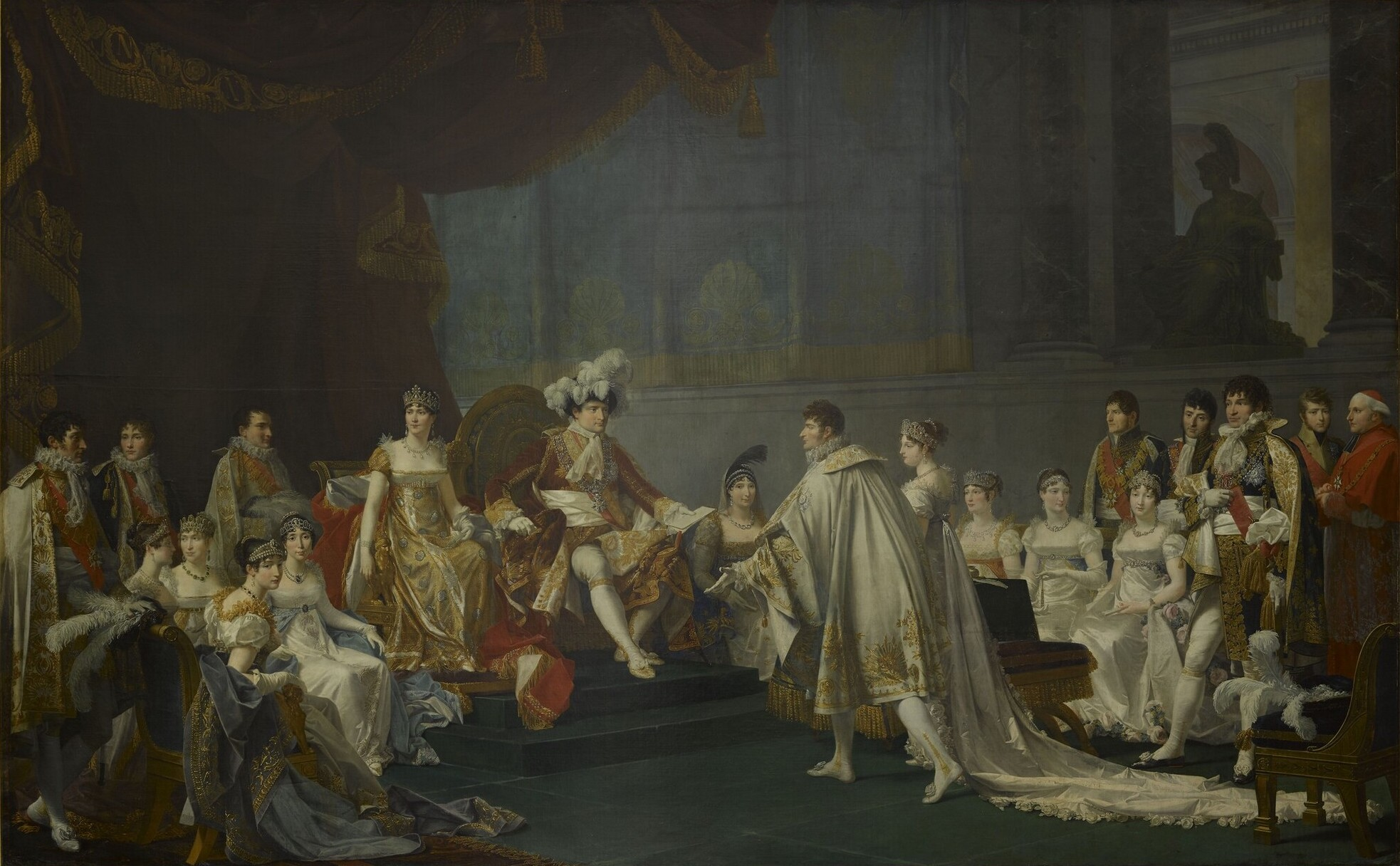
- Artist: Jean-Baptiste Regnault
- Year: c.1810
- Type: Oil on canvas, history painting
- Dimensions: 402 cm × 646 cm (158 in × 254 in)
- Location: Palace of Versailles; Versailles

The Wedding of Jérôme Bonaparte and Catherine of Württemberg French: (Mariage de Jérôme Bonaparte et de Catherine de Wurtemberg) is a history painting by the French artist Jean-Baptiste Regnault. It depicts the civil wedding between Jérôme Bonaparte and Catharina of Württemberg held on 22 August 1807 at the Tuileries Palace in Paris. Jérôme was the younger brother of the French Emperor Napoleon, who had pressured him to end his marriage to his first wife the American Elizabeth Patterson Bonaparte, in order to make a dynastic match with the daughter of the King of Württemberg. The two reigned over the French-backed Kingdom of Westphalia 1807 to 1813 until it as dissolved following the disastrous Battle of Leipzig. Following the defeat of Napoleon, she went into permanent exile with her husband.

The painting features portraits of a large number of members of the Bonaparte dynasty. Napoleon commissioned the work in 1807 as the basis for a tapestry to hang in Salon De Mars. Reganult was an experienced French painter and contemporary of Jacques-Louis David and François-André Vincent who had been trained in the Neoclassical style. The painting was displayed at the Salon of 1810 held at the Louvre in Paris. Today it is part of the collection of the Museum of French History at the Palace of Versailles.

== Bibliography ==
- Bordes, Phillipe. Jacques-Louis David: Empire to Exile. Yale University Press, 2007.
- Mansel, Philip. The Eagle in Splendour: Inside the Court of Napoleon. Bloomsbury Publishing, 2015.
