= Claude Gautherot =

French painter (1769–1825)

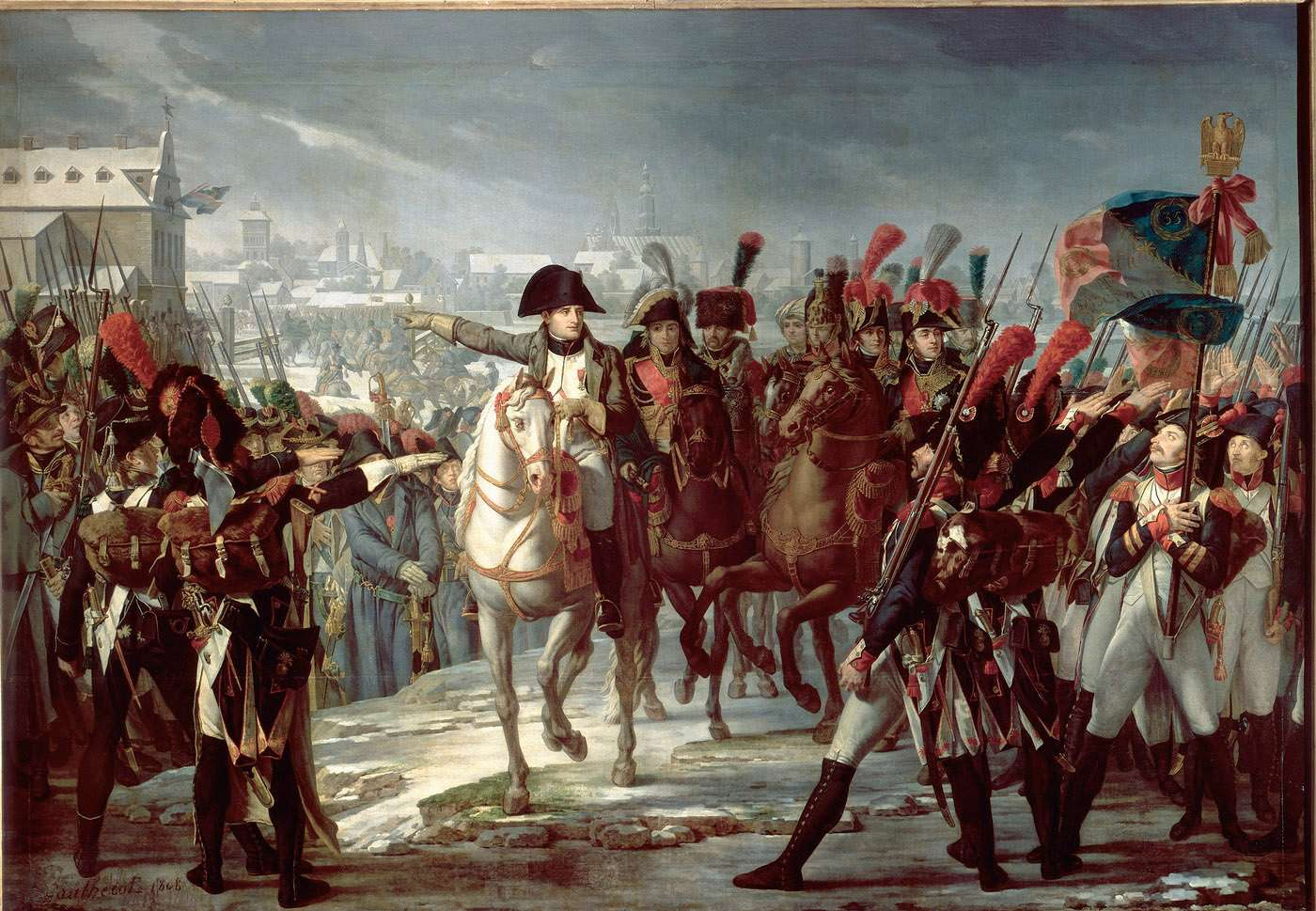
Napoleon haranguing his troops on the Bridge of the Lech at Augsburg

Pierre-Claude Gautherot (French: [pjɛʁ klod ɡotəʁo]; 1769–1825), usually referred to as either Claude Gautherot or Pierre Gautherot, was a French artist.

He was born and died in Paris. He was a pupil of Jacques-Louis David, whose friendship involved him in the troubles of the Revolution. Gautherot opened a school of design where the most noted artists studied under his direction. His principal work, Napoleon haranguing his troops on the Bridge of the Lech at Augsburg, is at Versailles.
