= 1810 in art =

Events in the year 1810 in Art.

== Events ==
- 5 November – Salon of 1810 opens at the Louvre in Paris.
- unknown dates
  - Four members of the Vienna Lukasbund (Johann Friedrich Overbeck, Franz Pforr, Ludwig Vogel and Johann Konrad Hottinger) move to Rome where they occupy the abandoned monastery of San Isidoro and join with others to form the Nazarene movement.
  - Dominique Vivant Denon assists the Hermitage Museum in the acquisition of Rosso Fiorentino's Madonna and Child with Cherubs in Paris.

== Works ==
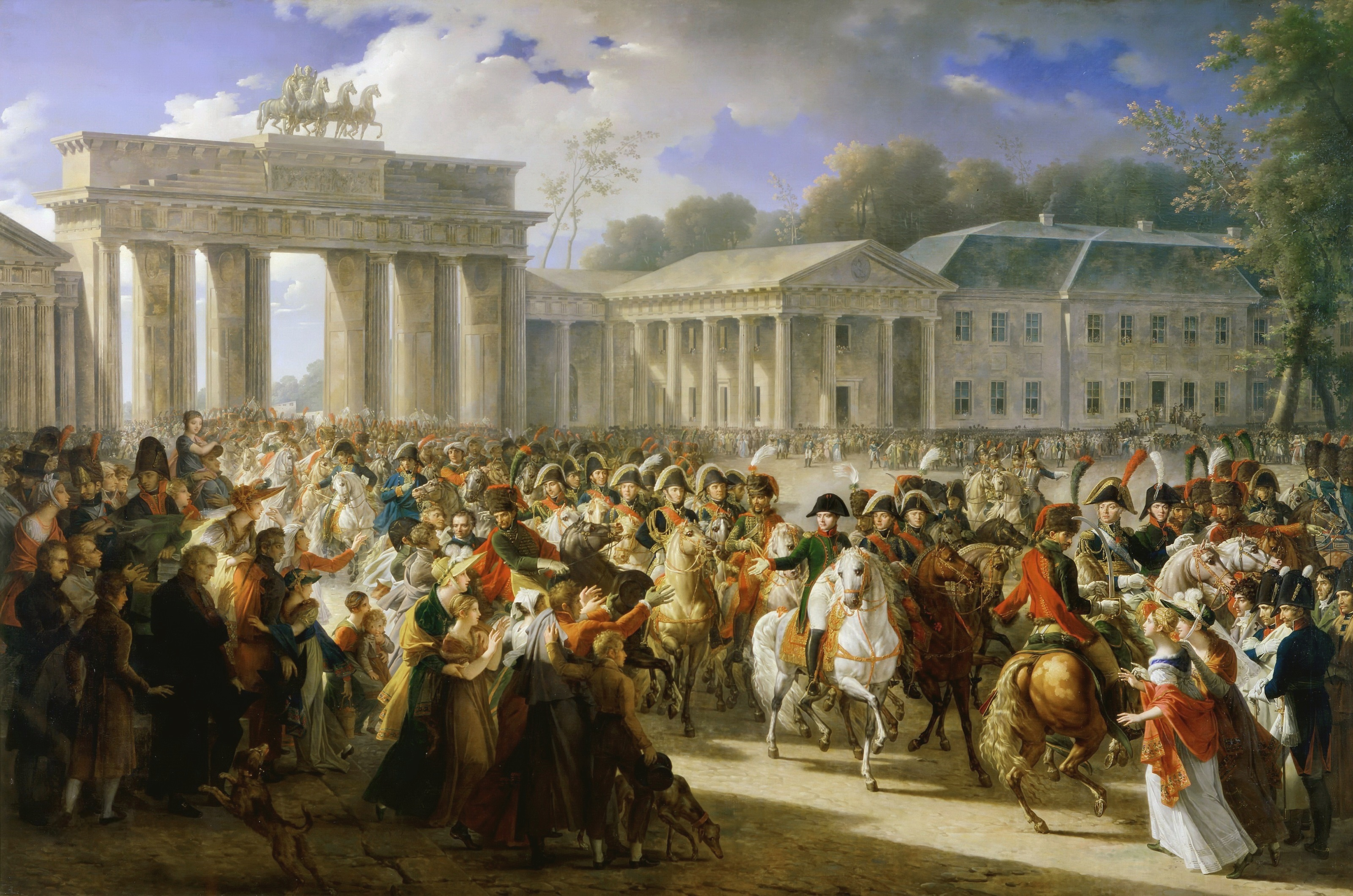
Entry of Napoleon into Berlin by Charles Meynier.

- William Beechey – Portrait of Francis Bourgeois
- Edward Bird – The Village Choristers
- William Blake – A Vision of the Last Judgment (lost)
- Louis-Léopold Boilly – The Public Viewing David's 'Coronation' at the Louvre
- John Constable – The Church Porch, East Bergholt
- Jacques-Louis David
  - The Distribution of the Eagle Standards
  - Portrait of Comtesse Daru
- Louis Ducis – Portrait of Napoléon Bonaparte with his Nephews and Nieces on the Terrace at Saint-Cloud
- Caspar David Friedrich – The Abbey in the Oakwood
- Claude Gautherot – Napoleon Wounded at Ratisbon
- François Gérard
  - The Battle of Austerlitz
  - Portrait of Portrait of Camillo Borghrse
  - Portrait of Désirée Clary
  - Portrait of Marie Walewska
- Anne-Louis Girodet de Roussy-Trioson – The Revolt of Cairo
- Francisco Goya
  - Allegory of the City of Madrid
  - The Disasters of War (prints – series begins)
- Antoine-Jean Gros –
  - The Battle of the Pyramids
  - Napoleon Accepting the Surrender of Madrid
- Thomas Lawrence
  - Portrait of Benjamin West
  - Portrait of Mirza Abul Hasan
- Charles Meynier – Entry of Napoleon into Berlin
- Alexander Nasmyth – Loch Katrine
- Adolphe Roehn – Napoleon's Bivouac on the Battlefield of Wagram
- Georges Rouget – The Wedding of Napoleon and Marie Louise
- Gioacchino Giuseppe Serangeli – Farewell of Napoleon and Alexander after the Peace of Tilsit
- Jacques François Joseph Swebach-Desfontaines – The Passage of the Danube by Napoleon Before the Battle of Wagram
- J. M. W. Turner
  - High Street, Oxford
  - The Fish Market at Hastings Beach

== Awards ==
- Grand Prix de Rome, painting:
- Grand Prix de Rome, sculpture:
- Grand Prix de Rome, architecture:

== Births ==
- January 15 – John Evan Thomas, Welsh sculptor (died 1873)
- January 23 – John Rogers Herbert, English religious painter (died 1890)
- May 26 – Christen Købke, Danish painter (died 1848)
- May 28 – Alexandre Calame, Swiss painter (died 1864)
- July 17 – Georg Heinrich Busse, German landscape painter and engraver (died 1868)
- September 3 – Paul Kane, Irish-Canadian painter (died 1871)
- September – William Edward Frost, English painter of female nudes (died 1877)
- October 11 – Anton Zwengauer, German painter (died 1884)

== Deaths ==
- January 6 – Charles-Antoine Clevenbergh, Flemish painter of still-life (born 1755)
- January 23
  - John Hoppner, portrait painter (born 1758)
  - Francesco Piranesi, Italian engraver and architect (born 1756/1758)
- March 1 – Jean-Jacques de Boissieu, painter and etcher (born 1736)
- March 8 – Christopher Barber, English miniature painter (born 1736)
- March 9 – Ozias Humphrey, English painter of portrait miniatures (born 1742)
- March 19 – Louis Masreliez, Swedish painter and interior designer (born 1748)
- April 18 – Antoine-Denis Chaudet, French sculptor who worked in a neoclassical style (born 1763)
- May – Richard Crosse, English painter of portrait miniatures (born 1742)
- May 2 – Jean Guillaume Moitte, French sculptor (born 1746)
- June 7 – Luigi Schiavonetti, Italian artist (born 1765)
- June 22 – John Boyne, Irish water-colour painter (born 1750)
- August 28 – Henry Blundell, art collector (born 1724)
- October 26 – Vinzenz Fischer, Austrian historical painter and professor of architecture (born 1729)
- November 1 – Charles Grignion the Elder, British engraver and draughtsman (born 1721)
- November 11 – Johann Zoffany – German neoclassical painter (born 1733)
- November 30 – Stefano Tofanelli, Italian painter during the Neoclassic period (born 1750)
- December 2 – Philipp Otto Runge, painter (born 1777)
- December 18 – John Inigo Richards, English landscape painter (born 1731)
- December 22 – William Baillie, Irish engraver (born 1723)
- date unknown
  - Johan Alm, Finnish painter and field sergeant (born 1728)
  - Jonas Bergman, Finnish painter (born 1724)
  - William Ellis, English engraver (born 1747)
  - John Emes, British engraver and water-colour painter (born 1762)
  - Luke Havell, English engraver, etcher and painter (born 1752)
  - Pietro la Vega, Italian archaeologist and artist (born unknown)
