= 1736 in art =

Events from the year 1736 in art.

== Paintings ==
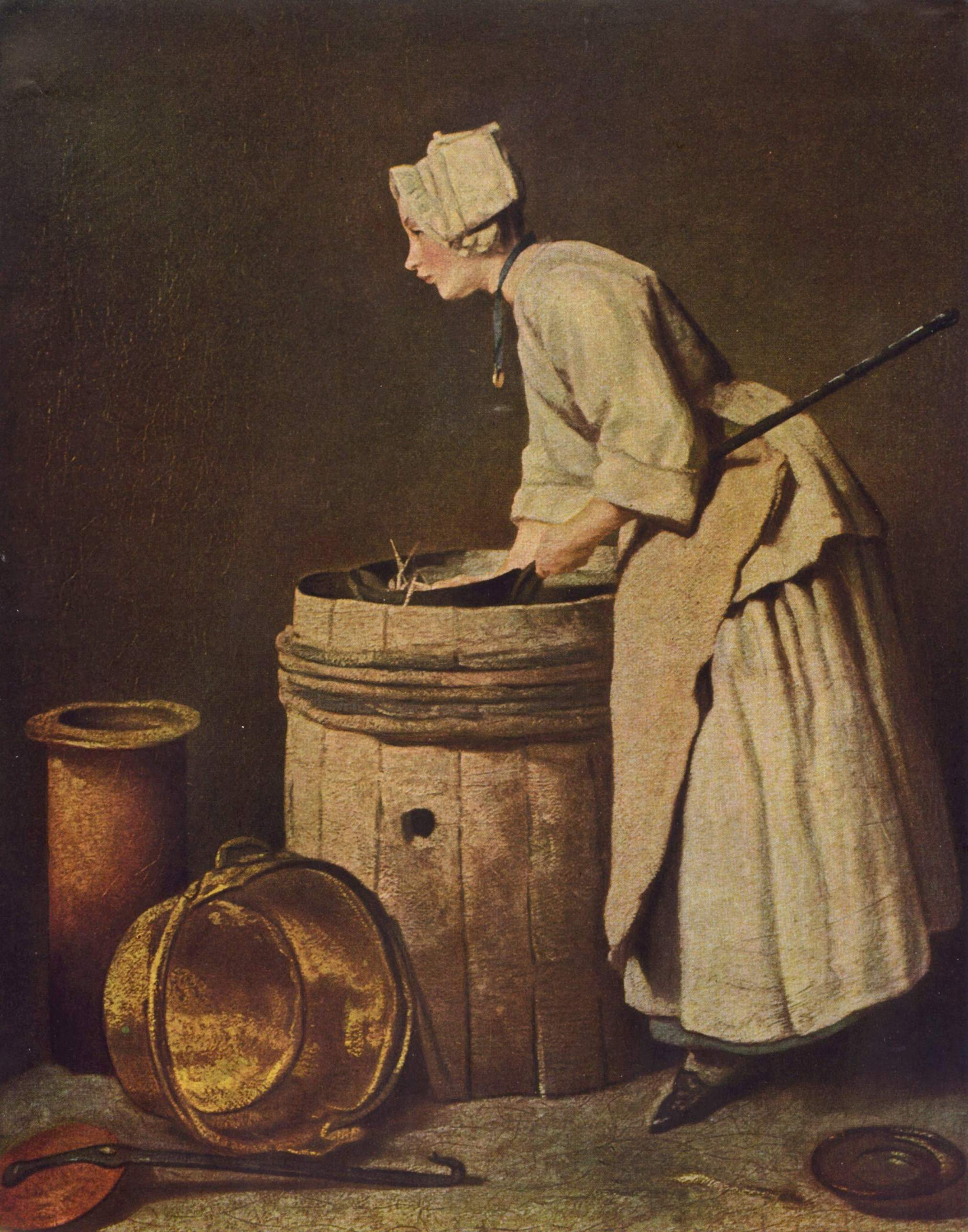
Chardin – Woman Scouring Dishes

- Bernard Accama – Anne, Princess Royal and Princess of Orange
- Canaletto – View of the Riva degli Schiavoni (Sir John Soane's Museum, London)
- Jean-Baptiste-Siméon Chardin – Woman Scouring Dishes
- William Hogarth
  - Christ at the Pool of Bethesda (St Bartholomew's Hospital)
  - Four Times of the Day (series)
- Clemente Ruta – Extasis of St. Peter of Alcantara (San Pietro d'Alcantara (Parma))
- Samuel Scott – A Danish Timber Bark Getting Under Way
- Willem Van der Hagen – View of Waterford

== Births ==
- February 5 – Joaquín Inza y Ainsa, Spanish Baroque painter (died 1811)
- February 6 – Franz Xaver Messerschmidt, German sculptor most famous for his collection of busts with extreme facial expressions (died 1783)
- February 19 – Simon Charles Miger, French engraver (died 1828)
- June 22 – Auguste-Louis de Rossel de Cercy, French painter primarily of naval scenes (died 1804)
- July 21 – Ulla Adlerfelt, Swedish painter and noblewoman (died 1765)
- August 7 – Johann Nepomuk della Croce, Austrian painter (died 1819)
- August 15 – Alexander Runciman, Scottish painter (died 1785)
- October 28 - Martin Ferdinand Quadal, Moravian-Austrian painter and engraver (died 1811)
- November 18 – Anton Graff, Swiss portrait painter (died 1813)
- November 30 – Jean-Jacques de Boissieu, French painter and etcher (died 1810)
- date unknown
  - Andrea-Salvatore Aglio, Italian sculptor and painter on marble (died 1786)
  - Christopher Barber, English miniature painter (died 1810)
  - Charlotta Cedercreutz, Swedish painter and noblewoman (died 1815)
  - Fyodor Rokotov, Russian painter specializing in portraits (died 1809)

== Deaths ==
- April 2 – Étienne Allegrain, French topographical painter (born 1644)
- July 3 - Giuseppe Nicola Nasini, Italian painter of frescoes, director of Grand-Ducal Academy for the Arts (born 1657)
- July 25 – Jean-Baptiste Pater, French rococo painter (born 1695)
- August 14 – Victor Honoré Janssens, Flemish painter (born 1658)
- September 13 – Gaspar van Wittel, Dutch landscape painter (born 1653)
- October 23 - Tommaso Aldrovandini, Italian painter (born 1653)
- December - Antonina Houbraken, Dutch printmaker and drafter (born 1686)
- date unknown
  - Niccolò Bambini, Italian painter (born 1651)
  - Domenico Brandi, Italian painter primarily of still lifes of birds and animals, as well as pastoral landscapes (vedute) (born 1683)
  - Miguel del Aguila, Spanish historical painter (born unknown)
  - Chen Shu, Chinese painter (born 1660)
