= The Divorce of the Empress Josephine =

Painting by Henri Frédéric Schopin

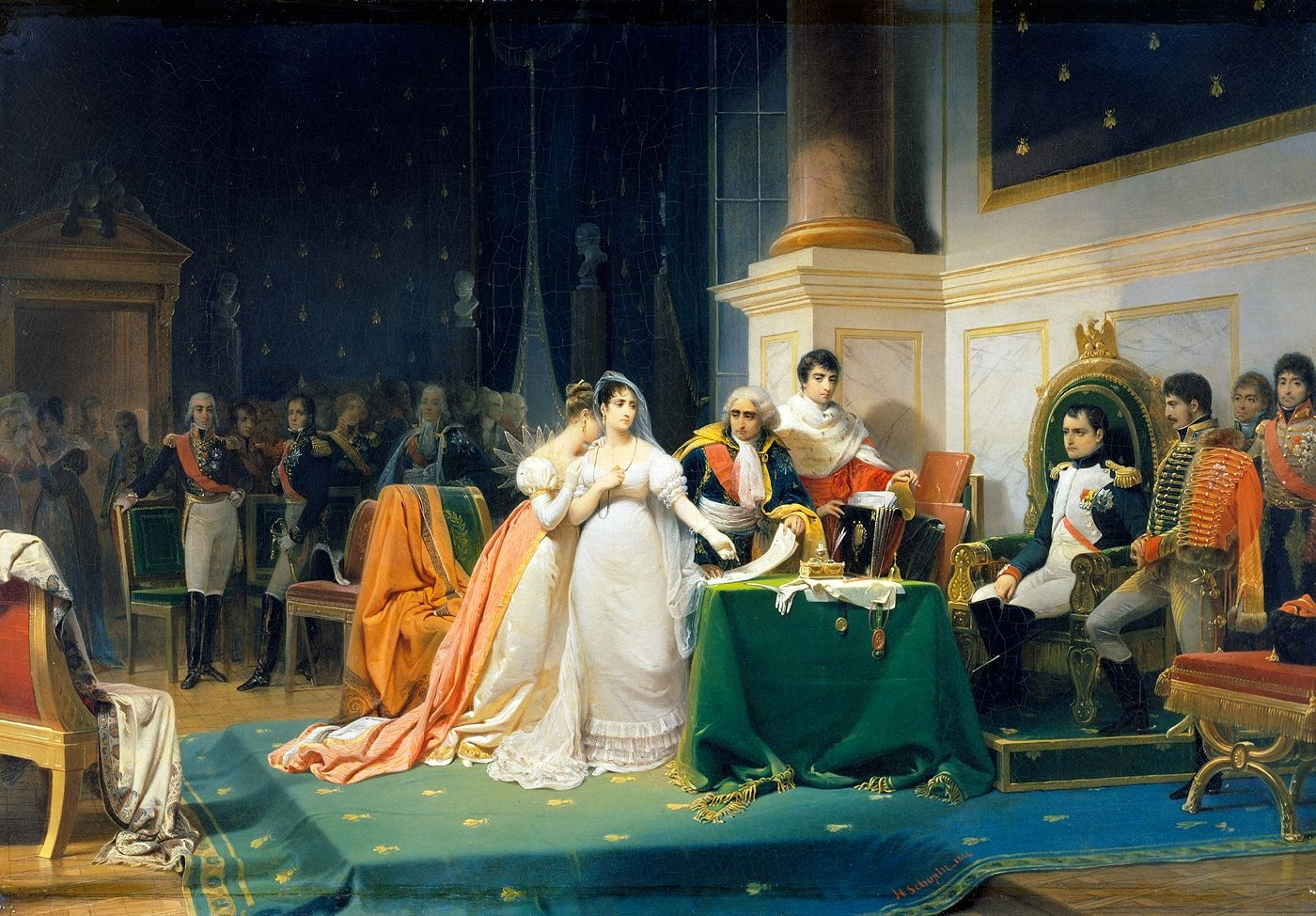
- Artist: Henri Frédéric Schopin
- Year: 1846
- Type: Oil on canvas, history painting
- Dimensions: 55.8 cm × 80.5 cm (22.0 in × 31.7 in)
- Location: Wallace Collection; London

The Divorce of the Empress Josephine (French: Le divorce de l'Impératrice Joséphine) is an 1846 history painting by the French artist Henri Frédéric Schopin. It depicts the formal divorce of Joséphine de Beauharnais from her husband Napoleon, Emperor of France, at the Tuileries Palace in Paris on 15 December 1809. The couple were unable to have children together and Napoleon sought an heir. After the divorce he was to marry the young Marie Louise, daughter of Francis I of Austria in 1810.

Josephine, having just signed the document of the civil dissolution of her marriage, is supported by her daughter Hortense. The document is held by Jean-Jacques-Régis de Cambacérès. Napoleon is seated on a throne on the right with Josephine's son Eugène de Beauharnais close by. Also in the scene are the politicians Michel-Louis-Étienne Regnaud de Saint-Jean d'Angély and Prince Talleyrand as well as the Marshals of the Empire Berthier, Bessières, Murat and Ney.

It was exhibited at the Salon of 1847 at the Louvre in Paris. Today it is in the Wallace Collection in London, having been acquired by the Marquess of Hertford in 1865, having previously been in the possession of Hortense's illegitimate son, the Duke of Morny.

== See also ==
- The Coronation of Napoleon, an 1807 painting by Jacques-Louis David showing Napoleon and Josephine at their 1804 coronation
- The Wedding of Napoleon and Marie Louise, an 1810 painting depicting Napoleon's second marriage by Georges Rouget

== Bibliography ==
- Connelly, Owen. The Wars of the French Revolution and Napoleon, 1792-1815. Routledge, 2012.
- Emery, Robert E. Cultural Sociology of Divorce: An Encyclopedia. SAGE, 2013.
- Ingamells, John. The Wallace Collection: French nineteenth century. Trustees of the Wallace Collection, 1985.
- Jay, Deborah. Napoleon's Other Wife: The Story of Marie-Louise, Duchess of Parma, the Lesser Known Wife of Napoleon Bonaparte. Rosa's Press, 2015.
