= The Wedding Banquet of Napoleon and Marie Louise =

Painting by Alexandre Dufay

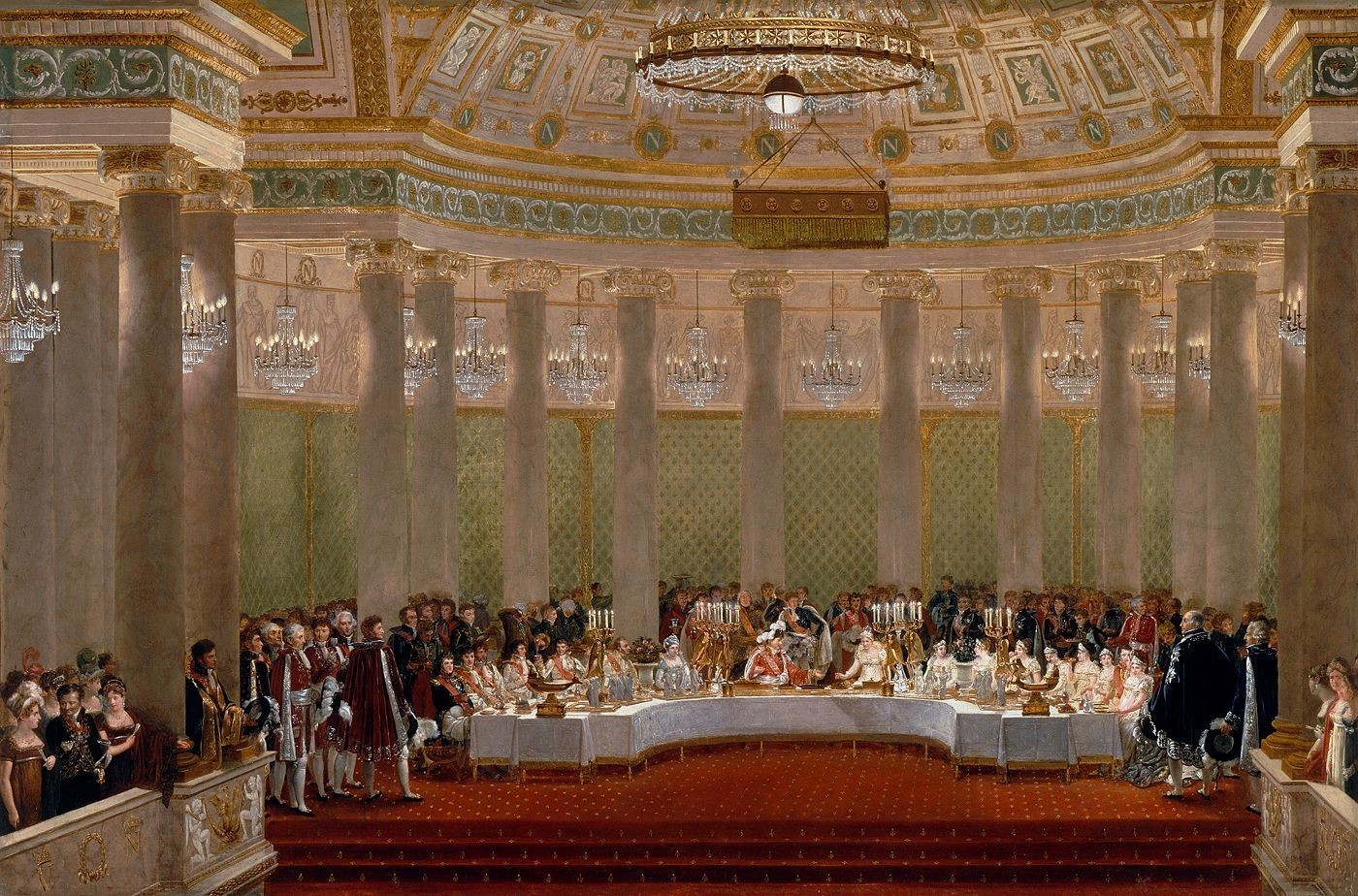
- Artist: Alexandre Dufay
- Year: 1812
- Type: Oil on canvas, history painting
- Dimensions: 148 cm × 224.5 cm (58 in × 88.4 in)
- Location: Palace of Fontainebleau; Fontainebleau

The Wedding Banquet of Napoleon and Marie Louise (French: Le Banquet du mariage de Napoléon et Marie-Louise) is an 1812 history painting by the French artist Alexandre Dufay. It portrays the wedding banquet of the French Emperor Napoleon and his second wife Marie Louise of Austria held at the Tuileries Palace in Paris on 2 April 1810. As well as the Emperor and Empress, a number of his family are seated around the table including his brothers Louis, Jérôme, sisters Caroline and Pauline and brother-in-law Joachim Murat. Other dignitaries including foreign envoys stand in the background. Joseph Bonaparte was absent in Spain during the Peninsular War but his wife Julie Clary was present. Seated on the Emperor's right is his mother Letizia The Austrian Emperor Francis I, the father of the bride, is represented by his younger brother Archduke Ferdinand.

It was exhibited at the Salon of 1812 at the Louvre in Paris. Today it is in the collection of Palace of Versailles and is on display at the Palace of Fontainebleau, a residence of Napoleon when Emperor. A preparatory sketch is in the Musée Carnavalet.

== See also ==
- The Wedding of Napoleon and Marie Louise, 1810 painting by Georges Rouget

== Bibliography ==
- DeLorme, Eleanor P. Joséphine and the Arts of the Empire. Getty Publications, 2005.
- Siemann, Wolfram. Metternich: Strategist and Visionary. Harvard University Press, 2019.
