= Raphaël de Monachis =

Detail from The Coronation of Napoleon, by Jacques-Louis David. Raphaël de Monachis is the figure in the red hood.

Anton Zakhūr Rafa'il (Arabic: أنطون زخور رافائيل; 1759–1831) known in France as Raphaël de Monachis was an Egyptian-born Christian monk of Syrian ancestry, known for his orientalist studies and for being one of Jean-François Champollion's language teachers.

== Biography ==
He was born in Cairo to a Syrian-Melkite family. He studied at the Greek seminary in Rome and took his vows at the Basilian Monastery of the Saviour in Sidon where he remained from 1789 to 1794 when he returned to Egypt. During Napoleon's campaign in Egypt he served as Napoleon's personal interpreter. In 1803 he traveled to France where after visiting Joseph Fourier in Grenoble, he traveled to Paris to give important documents to the French government. He was appointed as adjunct professor of Arabic language at the École des Langues Orientales. Among his students there was Champollion, to whom he taught colloquial Arabic and Coptic. He was also the single Arab member of the French Institut d'Égypte. His colleague there, Silvestre de Sacy, who taught literary Arabic was strongly opposed to having a second professor of Arabic at the School of Oriental languages, considering it a personal offense. In 1804 he participated in the Coronation of Napoleon I and was depicted in Jacques-Louis David's famous painting.

Among his unpublished manuscripts was a treatise in Arabic called Marj al-azhar wa bustan al hawadith al Akhbar ("The Hubbub of Al Azhar and the Garden of New Events"), in which he subtly critiqued the pedagogical methods of the Al-Azhar University by contrasting them to the more organized teaching of the French Academy.

In 1816 after the fall of Napoleon at Waterloo, he returned to Egypt where he entered the service of Muhammad 'Ali Pasha. He worked as a translator and poet, translating many works from Italian to Arabic.
