= Napoleon Pardoning the Rebels at Cairo =

Painting by Pierre-Narcisse Guérin

- Bonaparte Pardoning the Rebels of Cairo
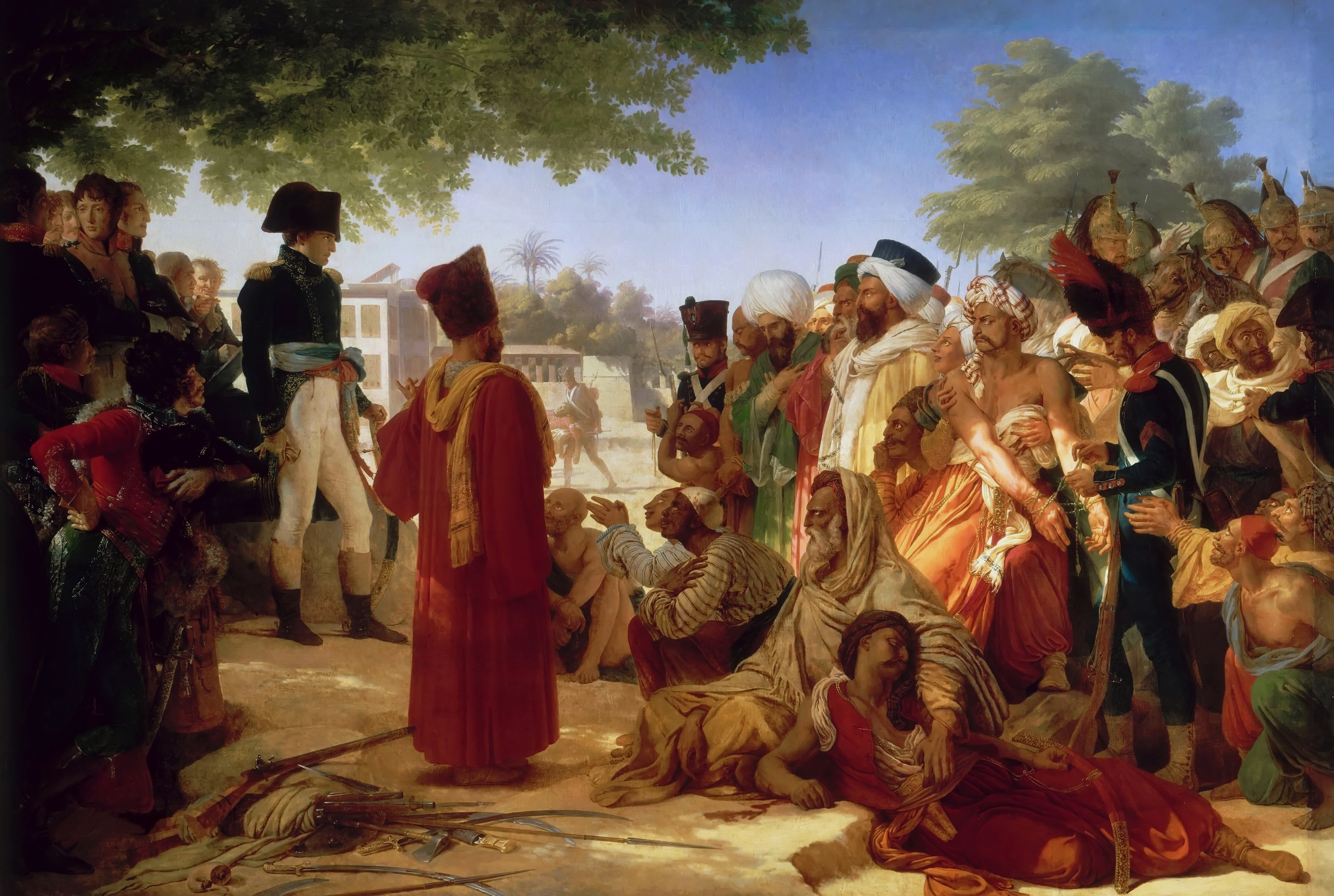
- Artist: Pierre-Narcisse Guérin
- Year: 1808
- Type: Oil on canvas, history painting
- Dimensions: 354 cm × 500 cm (139 in × 200 in)
- Location: Palace of Versailles, Versailles

Napoleon Pardoning the Rebels at Cairo is an 1808 history painting by the French artist Pierre-Narcisse Guérin. It depicts a scene on 23 October 1798 during the French invasion of Egypt. After crushing the Revolt of Cairo that had broken out two days earlier, Napoleon pardoned several of the leaders of the rebellion. The French general Joachim Murat and other French soldiers can be seen behind him. Later that night, Napoleon ordered the execution of many rebels he had pardoned earlier. It was one of a number of paintings produced in the era portraying Napoleon showing clemency towards defeated enemies.

The painting was originally commissioned by Napoleon to hang in the Tuileries Palace. It was exhibited at the Salon of 1808 at the Louvre in Paris. Today it is in the collection of the Palace of Versailles.

== Historical context ==
=== Revolt of Cairo ===
During the Napoleonic Wars, the French army invaded Egypt in 1798, reaching Cairo shortly after their landing in Alexandria. Throughout the summer and fall of the same year, the French Government ruled in the two cities. Nationalist uprisings which sprouted during that time were quickly stopped, but the Revolt of Cairo nearly pushed French forces from the city. After Egyptian civilians spread weapons and strengthened protection around mosques, French forces began to push back and forced locals to seek shelter in the Al-Azhar Mosque. After attempting to negotiate peace, Napoleon then fired upon the mosque and had his soldiers storm it, killing many of those inside. In total, approximately 300 Frenchmen were killed, alongside up to 6,000 casualties among the Egyptians.

=== Scene and aftermath ===
In the morning after the Mosque was fired on, Napoleon gathered surviving rebels and publicly pardoned them for their participation in the uprising. In the painting, Napoleon stands over a group of those surviving rebels, who look back at him with expressions varying from hatred to contrition. French officers are behind the general with a pile of guns (likely confiscated from the rebels) to his right and French soldiers carrying a wounded man in the background. While this pardon served to display Napoleon's benevolence to the remaining Egyptian public, he secretly ordered anyone who had been caught armed to be beheaded that night, and their corpses thrown into the Nile.

== Artistic interpretation and comparison ==
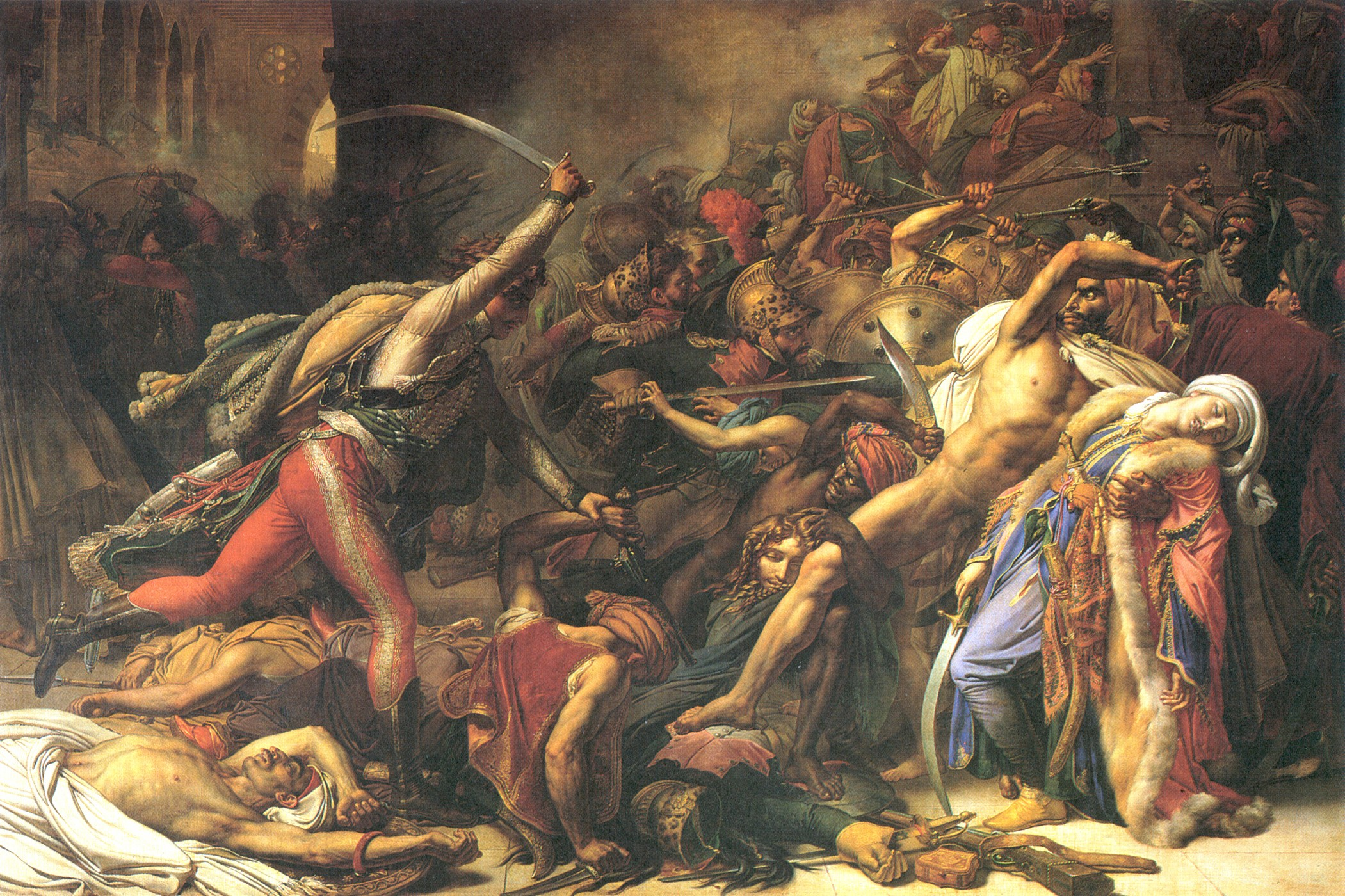
The Revolt of Cairo (Girodet, 1810)

Much of the modern scholarship around this painting also talks about it in relationship to Girodet's The Revolt of Cairo (1810), which depicts a clash between French and Egyptian forces during the Revolt itself. The works function in tandem, with Girodet's showing to the French public the heroism and bravery of French soldiers in the face of violence, and Guérin's piece showcasing Napoleon's mercy and the "righteousness" of his ways. Similarly, the peaceful forgiveness of Napoleon Pardoning the Rebels offers a counterpoint to the violence and anger in The Revolt of Cairo, and it served to offset the rumors of Napoleon's merciless treatment of the war prisoners.

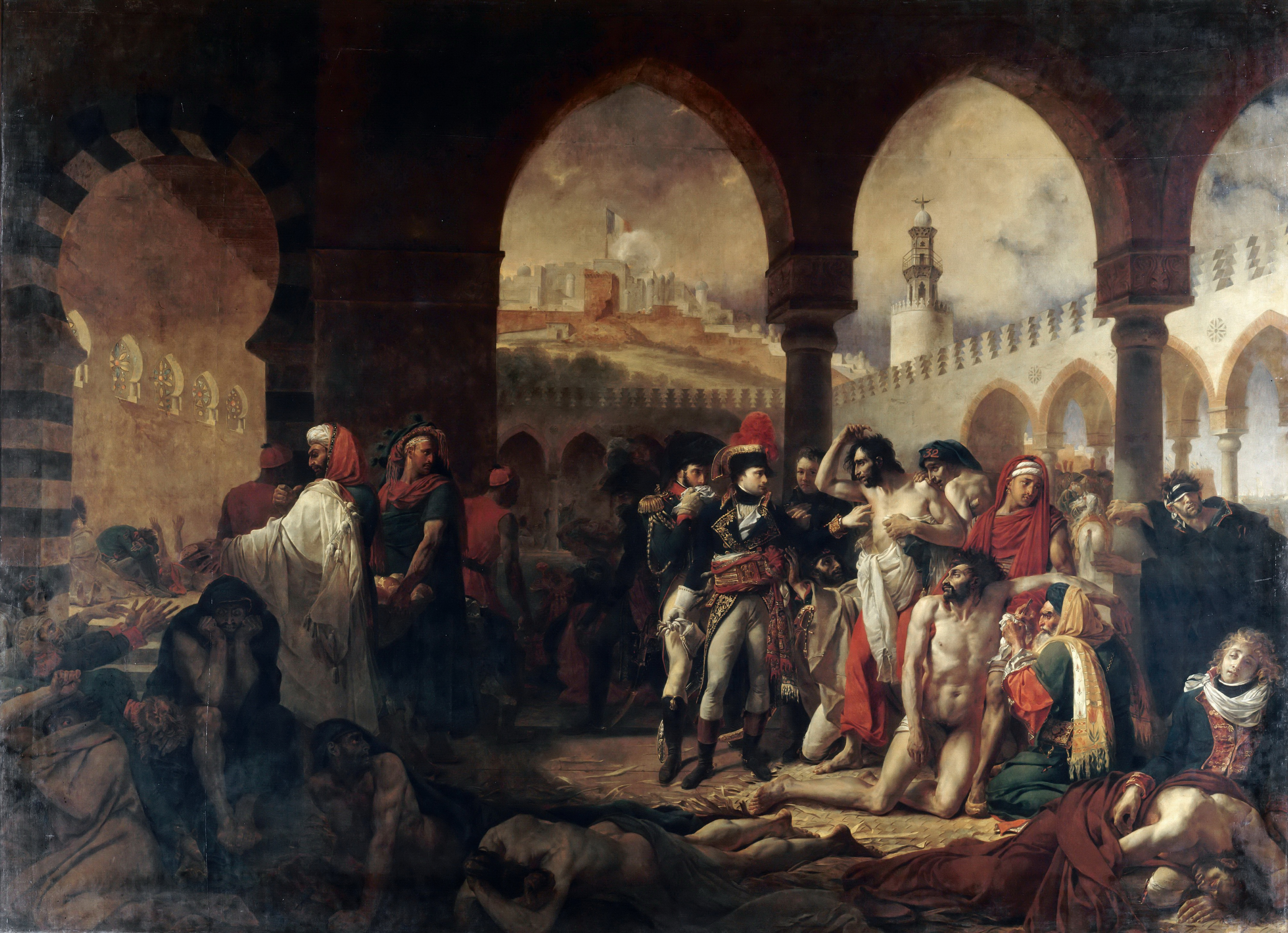
Bonaparte Visiting the Plague Victims of Jaffa (Antoine-Jean Gros, 1804)

The poses of Napoleon and the Egyptians in this work have also been discussed extensively. Todd Porterfield describes Napoleon's posture facing the Cairenes as "paternal,” while the prisoners “fiercely stare at Bonaparte or childishly plead, humiliated and resigned.” Robert Rosenblum similarly suggests that Guérin presents the Egyptians as “still ignorant…of the virtues of Napoleonic rule.” Relatedly, the work has also been discussed as having Orientalist tropes. Porterfield argues that the painting contrasts Napoleon's "nobility" with Middle Eastern "animality." The work as also been discussed as part of a broader campaign to promote European global supremacy, as Napoleon fiercely believed that the French people would soon earn the world's respect and bring peace to Europe.

Modern scholars have also related the work to other pieces of Napoleonic propaganda such as Antoine-Jean Gros's Bonaparte Visiting the Plague Victims of Jaffa (1804), noticing how Bonaparte consistently had artists display his goodwill towards the weak, poor, or those who have wronged him. Deepening this connection, scholars have noted it is possible that part of the reason for this overrepresentation of Napoleon's clemency towards the rebels could be to improve his public image after his mistreatment of the prisoners at Jaffa. Furthermore, academics have written that throughout much of the work Napoleon commissioned, he wished to be compared and portrayed similarly to historical nobility. Napoleon often asked his commissioned artists to model him after Scipio, Trajan, Bayard, Henri IV, and others. Like in the Jaffa painting, Guérin depicts Napoleon as a gracious, God-like savior, who displays clemency in a similar manner to those earlier figures. Guérin also helped promote the idea of Napoleon as a peacemaker at a time when many in France were tiring of constant imperial wars.
