= Portrait of Comtesse Daru =

1810 Painting by Jacques-Louis David

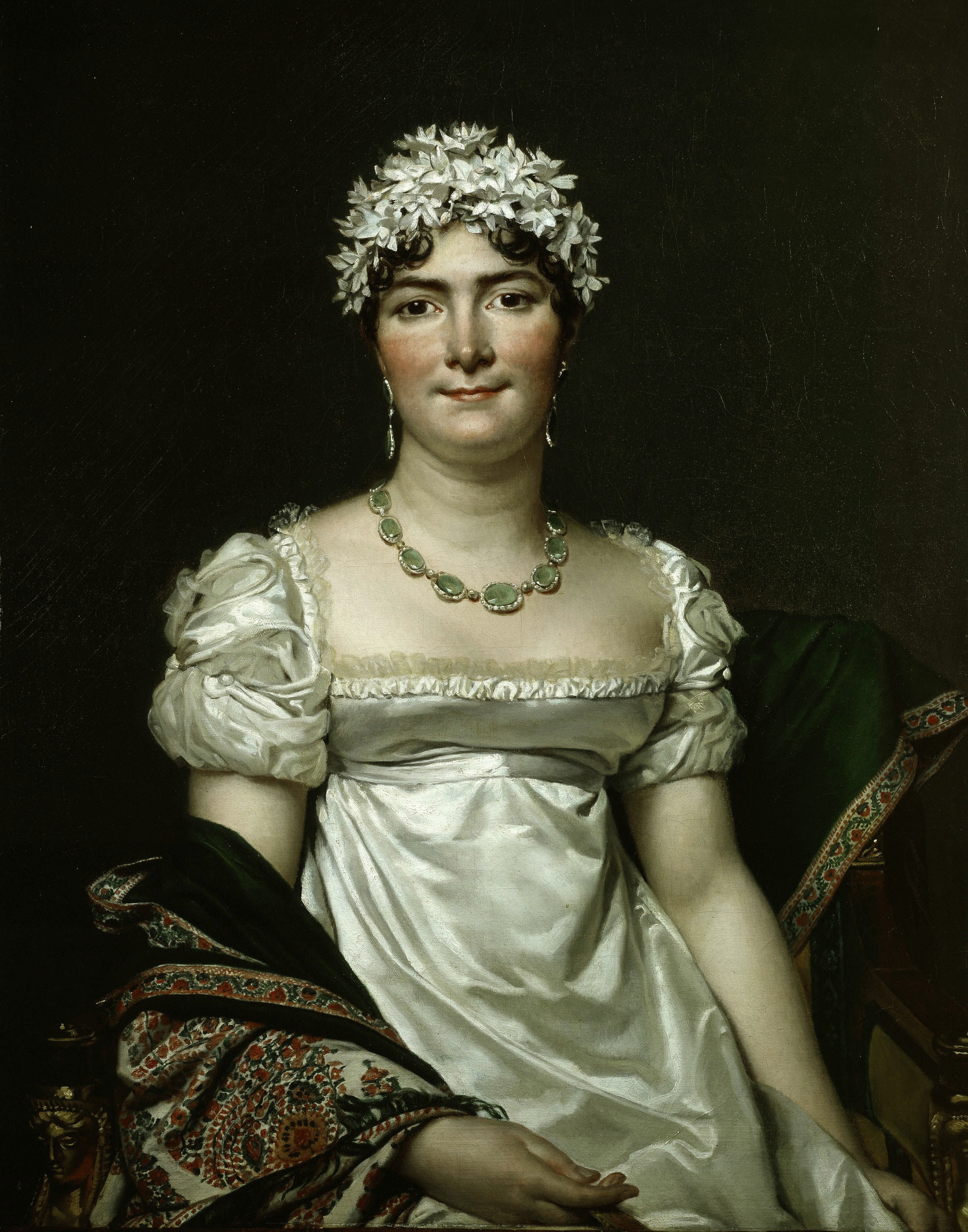
- Artist: Jacques-Louis David
- Year: 1810
- Type: Oil on canvas, portrait painting
- Dimensions: 81.6 cm × 65.1 cm (32.1 in × 25.6 in)
- Location: Frick Collection, New York City

Portrait of Comtesse Daru is an 1810 portrait painting by the French arist Jacques-Louis David. It depicts Alexandrine-Thérèse, the wife of Pierre Daru who served as the military intendant general, in charge of administration for the armies of Napoleon. David had worked closely with her husband during the complex production of his large history painting The Coronation of Napoleon In gratitude for Daru's assitance David chose to surprise him with this porteait of his wife. The writer Stendhal, a cousin of the Count, witnessed the signing of the painting.

The painting is now in the Frick Collection in New York City which acquired it in 1937.

== See also ==
- List of paintings by Jacques-Louis David

== Bibliography ==
- Bordes, Phillipe. Jacques-Louis David: Empire to Exile. Yale University Press, 2007.
- De Nanteuil, Luc. Masters of Art: David. Harry N. Abrams, 1990.
