= The Public Viewing David's 'Coronation' at the Louvre =

Painting by Louis-Léopold Boilly

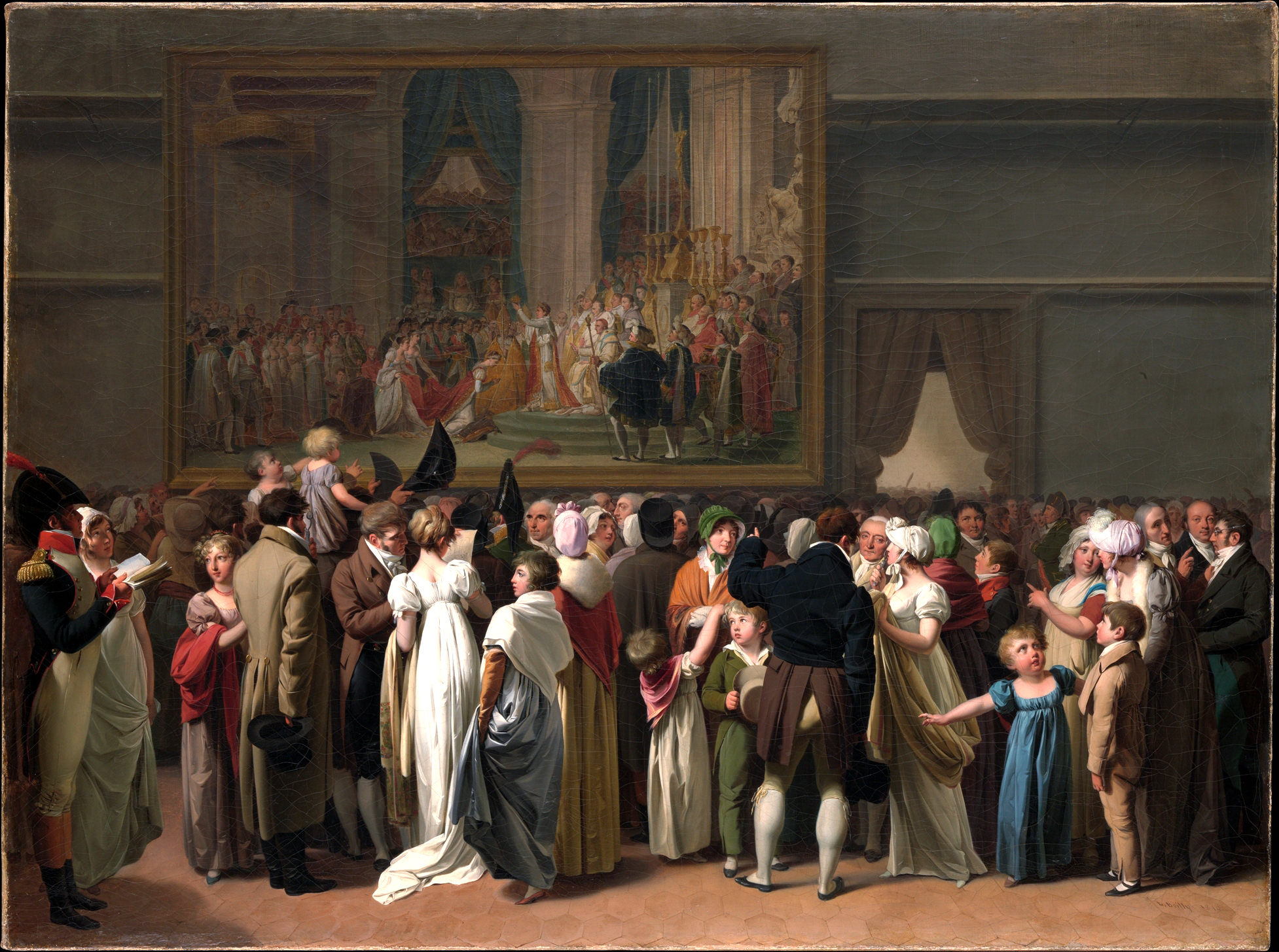
- Artist: Louis-Léopold Boilly
- Year: 1810
- Type: Oil on canvas, history painting
- Dimensions: 61.6 cm × 82.6 cm (24.3 in × 32.5 in)
- Location: Metropolitan Museum of Art; New York

The Public Viewing David's 'Coronation' at the Louvre is an 1810 oil painting by the French artist Louis-Léopold Boilly. It depicts a crowd of spectators at the Salon of 1808 at the Louvre in Paris examining the painting The Coronation of Napoleon by Jacques-Louis David, which portrays the coronation of Napoleon and his first wife Josephine. The spectators work out the various participants by the use of catalogues. Today the painting is in the collection of the Metropolitan Museum of Art in New York, having been acquired in 2012.

== Bibliography ==
- Alsdorf, Bridget. Gawkers. Princeton University Press, 2022.
- Bätschmann, Oskar. The Art Public: A Short History. Reaktion Books, 2023.
- Freund, Amy. Portraiture and Politics in Revolutionary France. Penn State Press, 2015.
