= Napoleon Accepting the Surrender of Madrid =

Painting by Antoine-Jean Gros

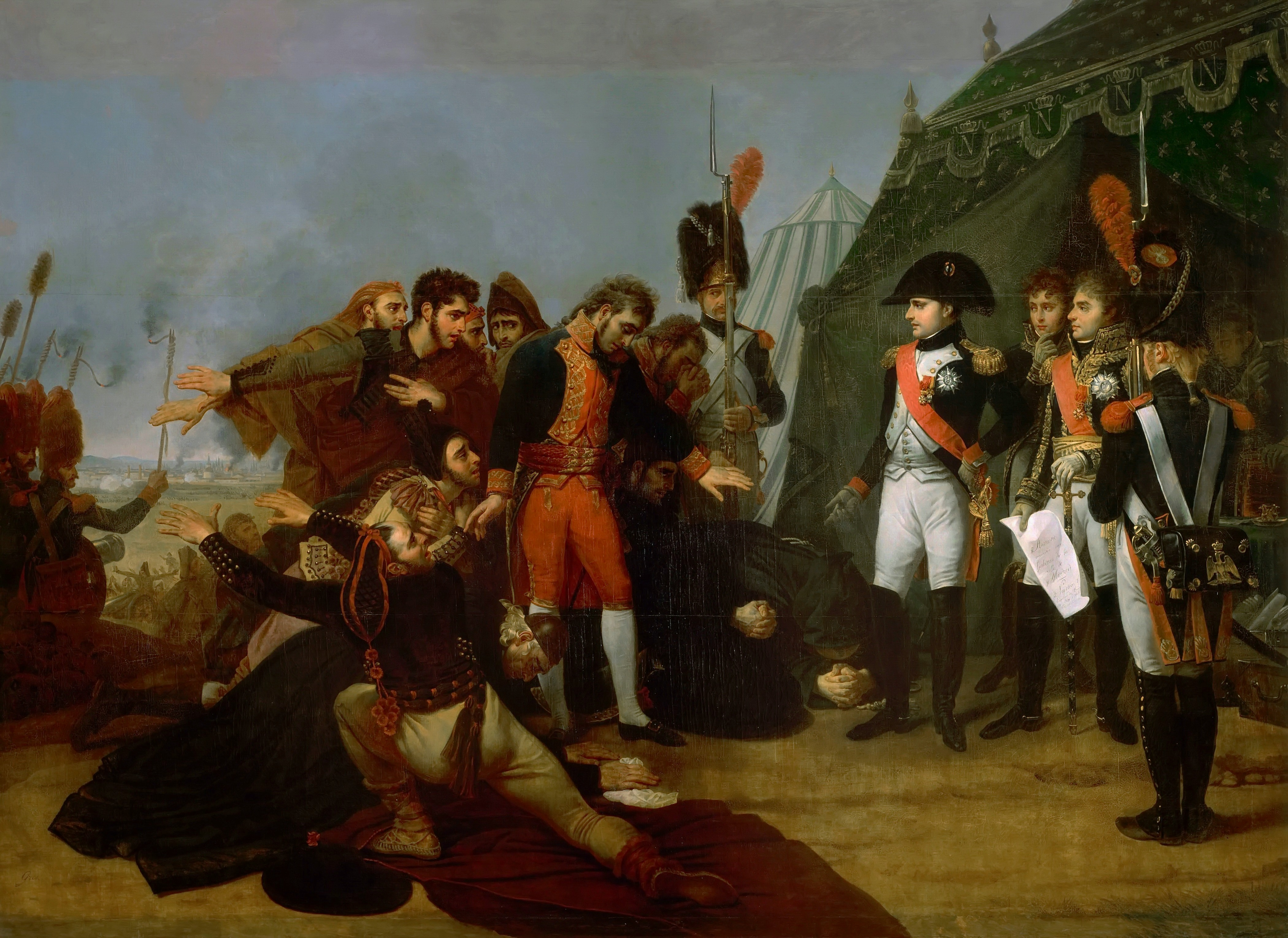
- Artist: Antoine-Jean Gros
- Year: 1810
- Type: Oil on canvas, history painting
- Dimensions: 361 cm × 500 cm (142 in × 200 in)
- Location: Palace of Versailles, Versailles

Napoleon Accepting the Surrender of Madrid (French: Capitulation de Madrid, le 4 décembre 1808) is an 1810 history painting by the French artist Antoine-Jean Gros. It depicts Napoleon, Emperor of France, accepting the capitulation of Madrid, on 4 December 1808, during the Peninsular War. Napoleon is shown with his general staff receiving a delegation from the city.

It depicts the scene in a grand manner style that favours the French viewpoint. It was exhibited at the 1810 Paris Salon, along with the painter's The Battle of the Pyramids, depicting Napoleon during the Egyptian campaign. Today both works are in the collection of the Palace of Versailles.

== Bibliography ==
- Boime, Albert (1993). A Social History of Modern Art, Volume 2: Art in an Age of Bonapartism, 1800-1815. University of Chicago Press.
- Eitner, Lorenz (2000). French Paintings of the Nineteenth Century: Before impressionism. National Gallery of Art.
- Muir, Rory (2013). Wellington: The Path to Victory, 1769–1814. Yale University Press.
- Palmer, Allison Lee (2019). Historical Dictionary of Romantic Art and Architecture. Rowman & Littlefield.
