= The Battle of the Pyramids (painting) =

Painting by Antoine-Jean Gros

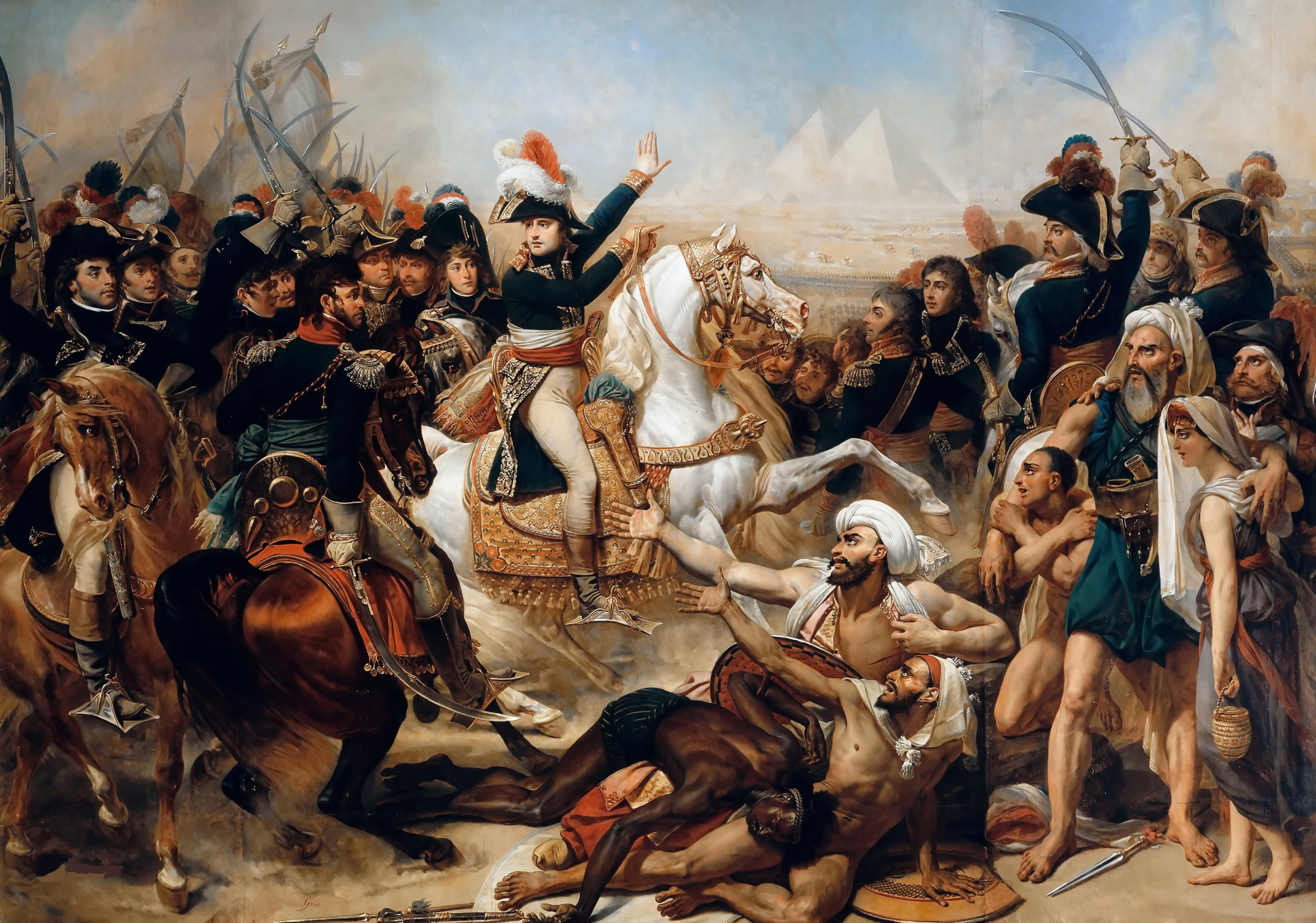
- Artist: Antoine-Jean Gros
- Year: 1810
- Medium: Oil on canvas
- Dimensions: 385 cm × 511 cm (152 in × 201 in)
- Location: Palace of Versailles, Versailles

The Battle of the Pyramids (French: La Bataille des Pyramides) is an oil on canvas history painting by the French artist Antoine-Jean Gros, frm 1810. It depicts the Battle of the Pyramids on 21 July 1798 during the French Invasion of Egypt. It is one of numerous paintings by Gros featuring Napoleon.

The Egyptian pyramids are clearly visible in the background. It was commissioned by the French Senate in 1809. It was exhibited at the Paris Salon of 1810. The same year he also exhibited his Napoleon Accepting the Surrender of Madrid. Today the painting is in the collection of the Palace of Versailles.

== Bibliography ==
- Grigsby, Darcy Grimaldo. Extremities: Painting Empire in Post-revolutionary France. Yale University Press, 2002.
- Murray, Christopher John. Encyclopedia of the Romantic Era, 1760–1850. Routledge, 2013.
- O'Brien, Thomas J. Eugène Delacroix and the Pictorial Invention of Orientalism. University of Wisconsin Press, 1998
