= The Revolt of Cairo =

Painting by Anne-Louis Girodet de Roussy-Trioson

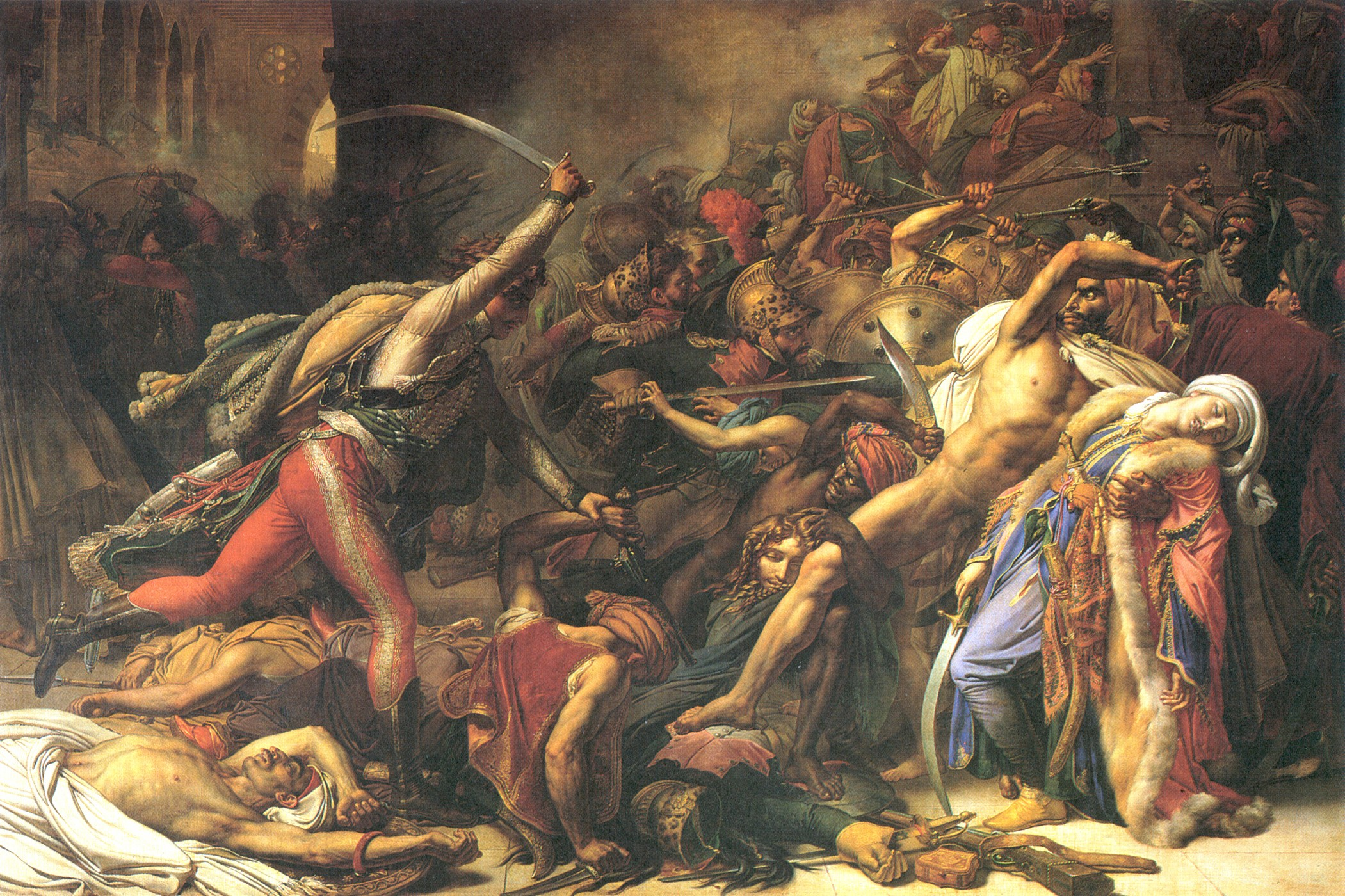
- Artist: Anne-Louis Girodet de Roussy-Trioson
- Year: 1810
- Type: Oil on canvas, history painting
- Dimensions: 365 cm × 500 cm (144 in × 200 in)
- Location: Palace of Versailles; Versailles

The Revolt of Cairo (French: Révolte du Caire) is an 1810 history painting by the French artist Anne-Louis Girodet de Roussy-Trioson.

== Description ==
It depicts a scene from the Revolt of Cairo that took place on 21 October 1798 during the French Invasion of Egypt under General Napoleon Bonaparte. An uprising by the inhabitants of French-occupied Cairo was ultimately suppressed after two days of fighting. Girodet portrays the scene on a large-scale, featuring a ferocious clash between melange of bodies. At the front is a French hussar charging on foot against a group of Mamelukes and Bedouin. Another hussar's severed head is held aloft. Stylistically it shows the influence of both Romanticism and Jacques-Louis David's Neoclassicism.

Napoleon, now Emperor of France, commissioned the work in 1809 for a fee of 12,000 Francs to hang in the Tuileries Palace in Paris. It was exhibited at the Paris Salon of 1810 at the Louvre. Today it is in the collection of the Palace of Versailles.

== See also ==
- Napoleon Pardoning the Rebels at Cairo, an 1808 painting by Pierre-Narcisse Guérin

== Bibliography ==
- Grigsby, Darcy Grimaldo. Extremities: Painting Empire in Post-revolutionary France. Yale University Press, 2002.
- O'Rourke, Stephanie. Art, Science, and the Body in Early Romanticism. Cambridge University Press, 2021.
- Thompson, Christopher W. Victor Hugo and the Graphic Arts 1820-1833. Librairie Droz, 1970.
