= Miguel del Aguila (painter) =

Spanish painter

Miguel del Aguila was a historical painter who died in Seville in 1736. His pictures are valued for their similarity to the style of Murillo.
