= The Wedding of Napoleon and Marie Louise =

Painting by Antoine-Jean Gros

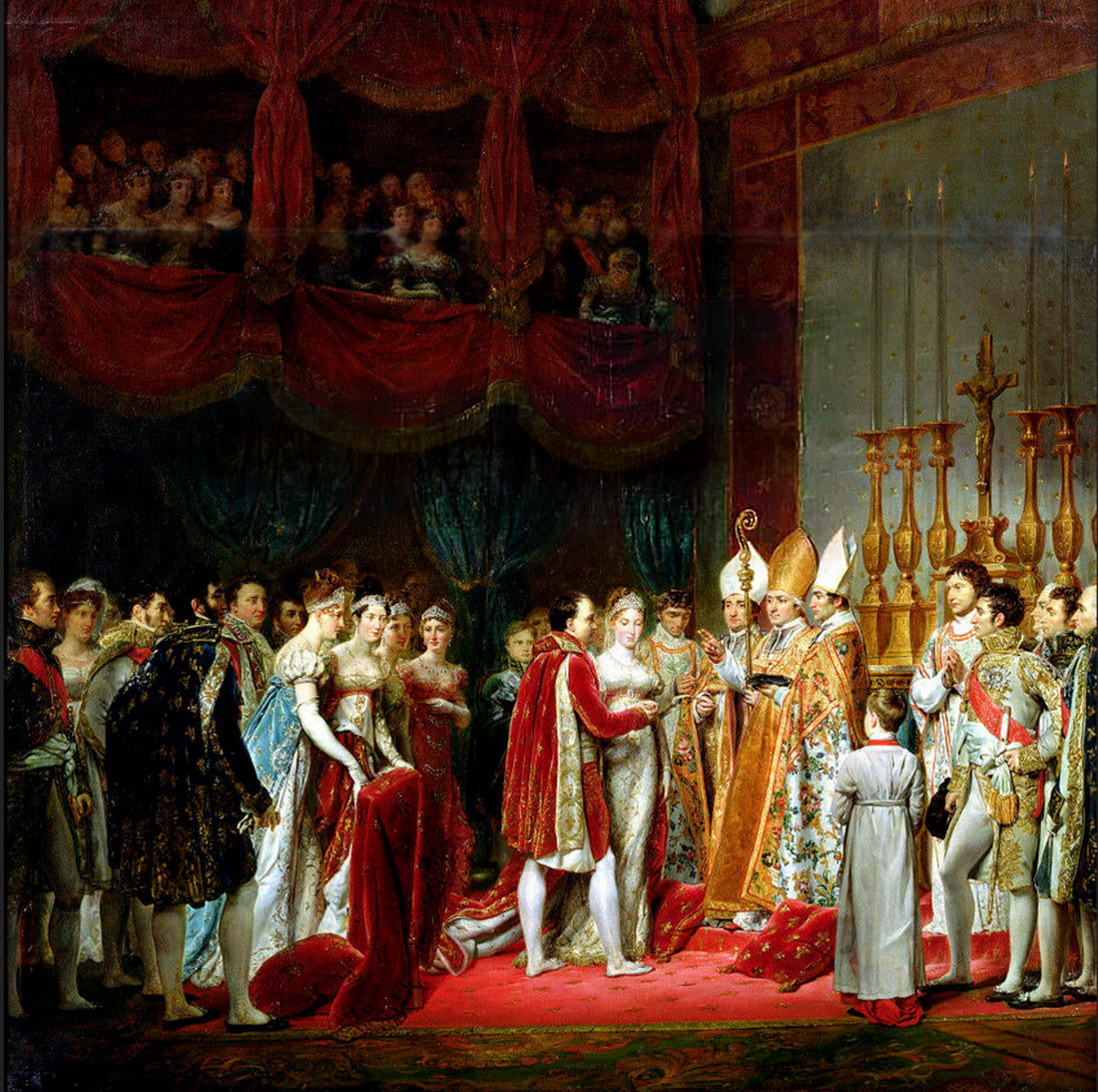
- Artist: Georges Rouget
- Year: 1810
- Type: Oil on canvas, history painting
- Dimensions: 185 cm × 182 cm (73 in × 72 in)
- Location: Palace of Versailles; Versailles

The Wedding of Napoleon and Marie Louise (French: Mariage de Napoléon Ier et de Marie-Louise) is an 1810 history painting by the French artist Georges Rouget.

== History and description ==
It depicts the wedding ceremony between Napoleon, Emperor of France and Marie Louise the daughter of the Austrian Emperor Francis I. The ceremony took place on 2 April 1810 in the Salon Carré of the Louvre in Paris. Napoleon had divorced his first wife Josephine in order to remarry in search of an heir and a dynastic marriage with the House of Habsburg.

The couple had already been married by proxy in Vienna with the bride's uncle Archduke Charles standing in for Napoleon. After entering France and meeting her husband for the first time, the couple went through both a civil ceremony and then this religious one, performed by Cardinal Joseph Fesch. Various figures of the Bonaparte family are depicted in the scene including Lucien Bonaparte, Jérôme Bonaparte, Letizia Bonaparte, Julie Bonaparte, Elisa Bonaparte, Pauline Bonaparte, Caroline Bonaparte, Hortense de Beauharnais, Eugène de Beauharnais, Joachim Murat and Camillo Borghese. The painting is now in the collection of the Palace of Versailles.

== See also ==
- The Wedding Banquet of Napoleon and Marie Louise, an 1812 painting by Alexandre Dufay
- The Divorce of the Empress Josephine, an 1846 painting by Henri Frédéric Schopin

== Bibliography ==
- Crow, Thomas. Restoration: The Fall of Napoleon in the Course of European Art, 1812-1820. Princeton University Press, 2023.
- Lemonie, Pierre. Versailles and Trianon: Guide to the Museum and National Domain of Versailles and Trianon. Réunion des musées nationaux, 1990.
- Zieseniss, Charles Otto & Le Bourhis, Katell. The Age of Napoleon: Costume from Revolution to Empire, 1789-1815. Metropolitan Museum of Art, 1989.
