= Louis Ducis =

French painter (1775–1847)

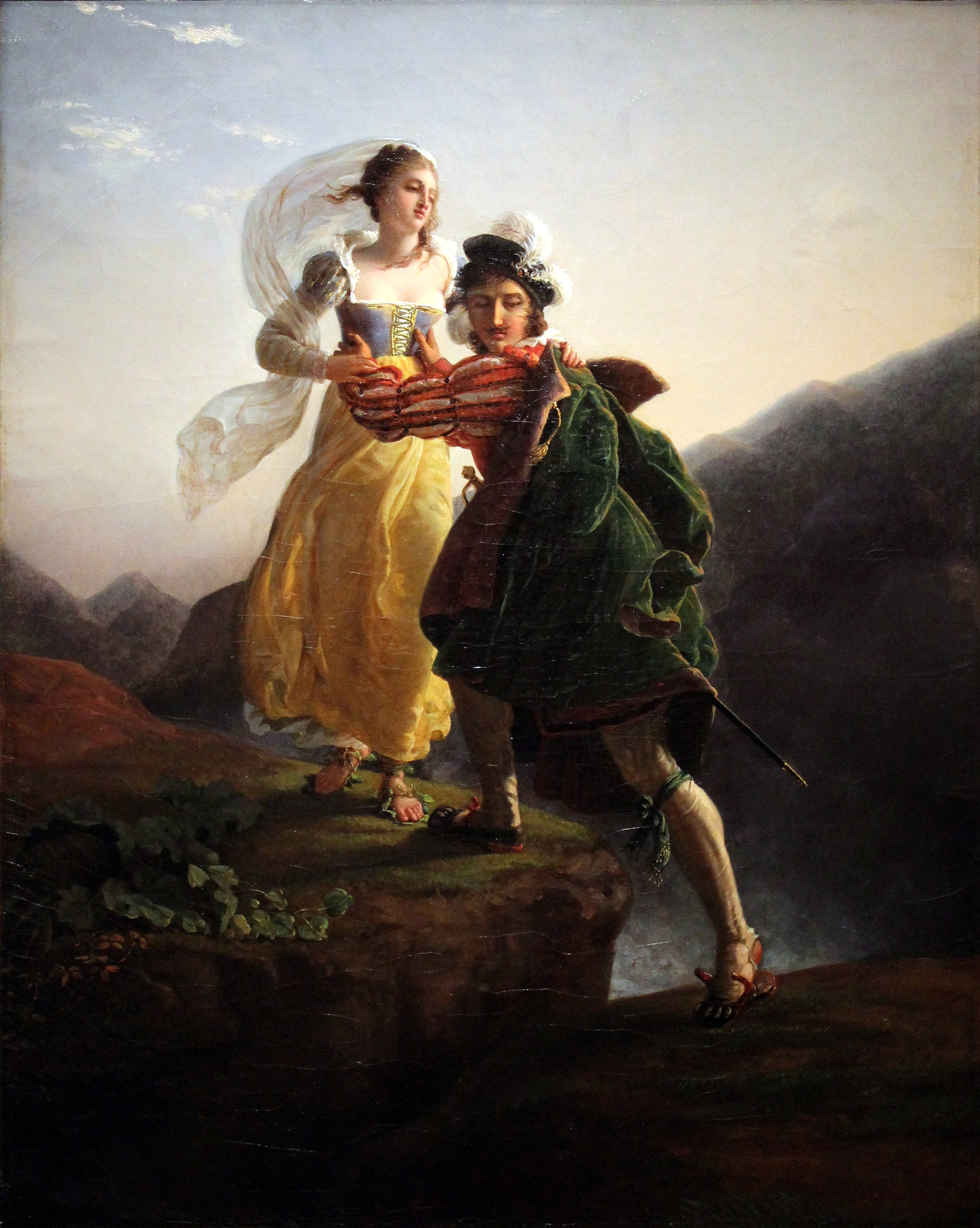
Louis Ducis, Bianca Cappello Fleeing with Her Lover

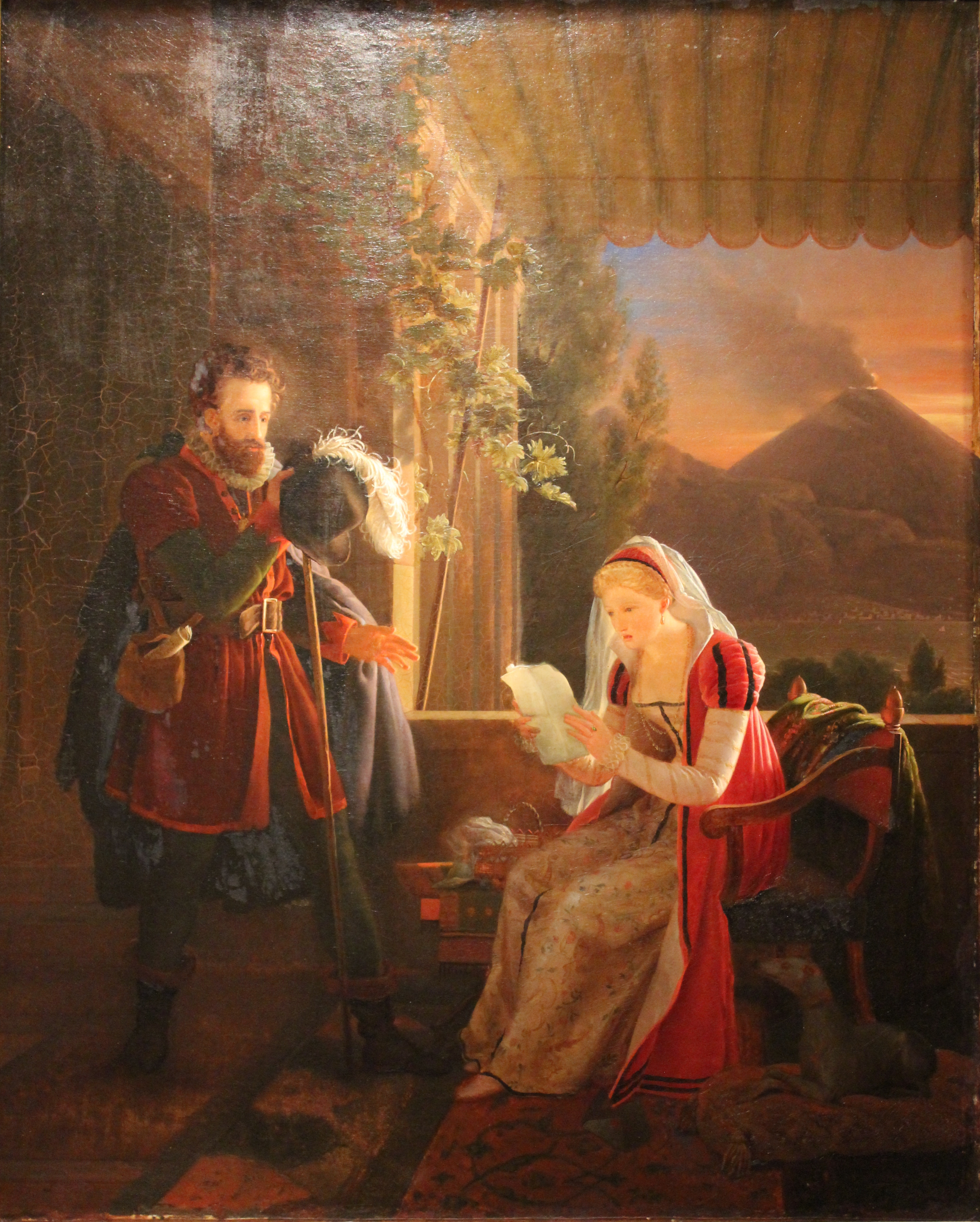
Le Tasse at his sister Cornelia's in Sorrento (1812)

Louis Ducis (14 July 1775 – 2 March 1847) was a French painter and student of Jacques-Louis David.

== Biography ==
Ducis was born in Versailles. He was instructed by David, whom he partly imitated in his historical pieces, besides which he devoted himself also to genre and portrait painting. His Mary Stuart and The Début of Talma were formerly in the Luxembourg Gallery. He died in 1847 in Paris.
