= Joaquín Inza y Ainsa =

Spanish painter

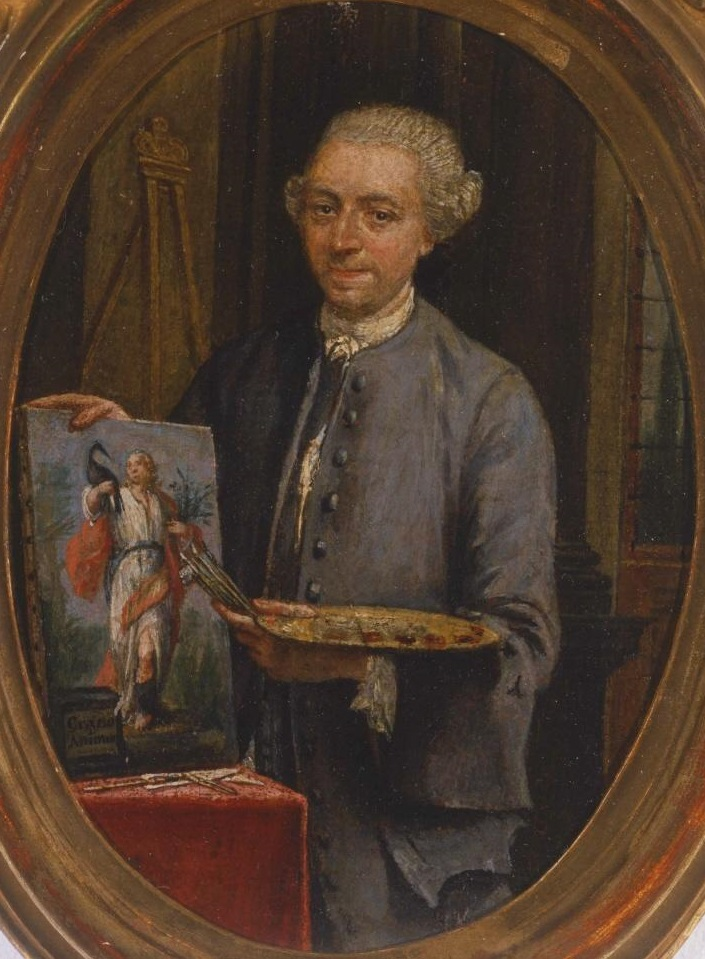
Self portrait (c. 1780), Real Academia de Bellas Artes de San Fernando, Madrid.

Joaquín Inza y Ainsa (19 July 1736 – 13 February 1811) was a Spanish Baroque painter.

== Biography ==
Inza was born in Ágreda and was the legitimate son of Felipe Inza and Rufina Ayssa, and paternal grandson of Martin and Rosa Alza. He joined as an apprentice in the workshop of his father, who was a painter and plasterer. In 1752 he entered the Real Academia de Bellas Artes de San Fernando. In this academy he had an unsuccessful presentation in 1753 for the annual art competition, with the submission Fauno del cabrito (Kid Faun), and therefore got no pension to travel to Rome in 1758 (the scholarship was won by José del Castillo). At twenty-two, however, he made his most clearly documented and best efforts, the fresco decoration of the ceiling and walls of the sacristy of the Virgin in the Basilica of Our Lady of the Pillar.

== Works ==
He received patronage from the Duchess of Arcos and Duke of Fernán Nuñez. Inza primarily painted portraits, many of them confused with those of his countryman Francisco Goya due to their similar styles, making attributions tricky. In this work he had important orders from the Royal Court including in 1760 full-length portraits of the children of Don Carlos and Don Gabriel (1770). Inza worked in the royal service record, but without ever obtaining any position on the court. In the 1770s, he painted at least three portraits of Charles III of Spain, which are preserved in the Sociedad Económica de los Amigos del País in Zaragoza and the Royal Academy of Jurisprudence and Legislation, all signed.

He also painted a portrait of the poet Tomás de Iriarte y Oropesa in 1785, one of Manuel Godoy, Prince of the Peace (1773), and of the Dowager Countess of Benavente, Zamora (1782). These commissions earned him good money and he was financially well-off, as revealed by his will on November 10, 1800.
