= Pietro la Vega =

Spanish archaeologist and artist

Pietro la Vega (died 1810) was a Spanish archaeologist and artist known for his drawings of the ruins of Pompeii, Herculaneum and Stabiae.

Originally, like his brother Francesco, Pietro was a military engineer. He was also a trained cartographer. Beginning in 1764 he worked with his brother, Francesco, who at that time was appointed as the director of excavations for Ferdinand, the Bourbon king of Naples. In 1804, when Francesco died, Pietro la Vega took over as director. Pietro la Vega was a very thorough and meticulous excavator, who kept copious notes. As a result, he made it possible for François Mazois (Carlo Francesco Mazois) to produce in 1824 the most complete report and synthesis ever published on Pompeii.
