= The Church Porch, East Bergholt =

Painting by John Constable

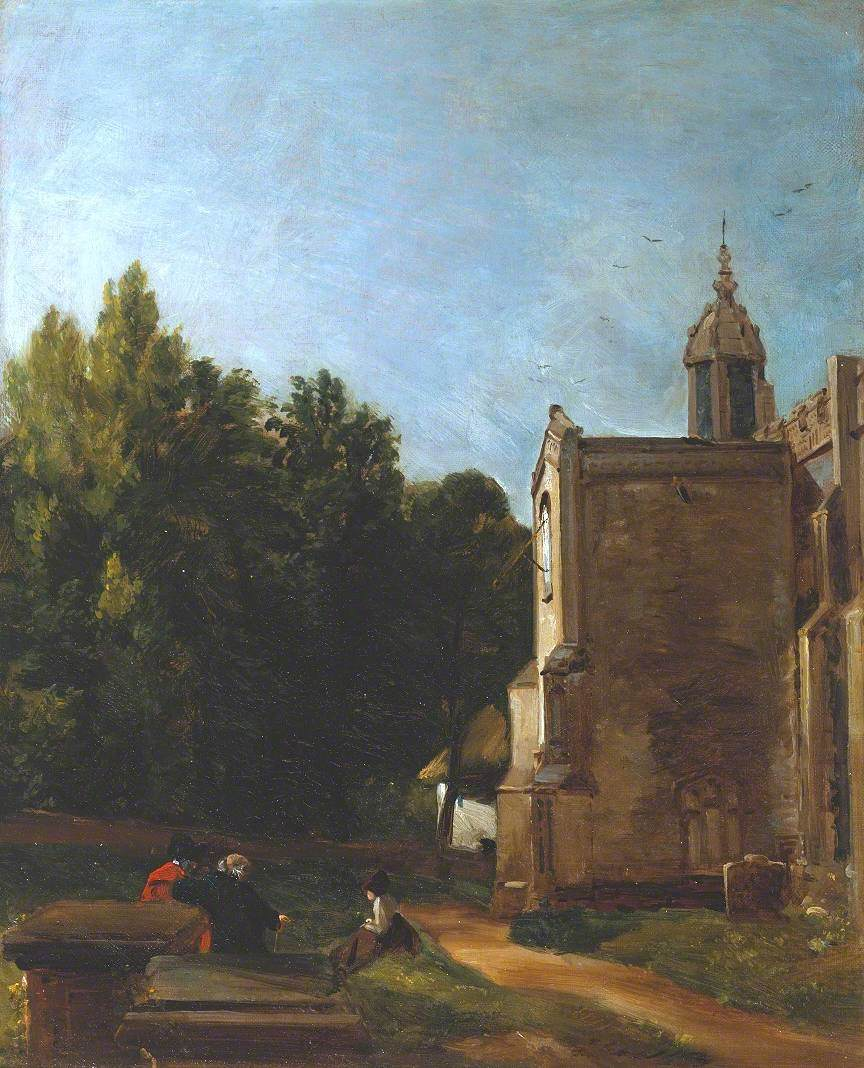
- Artist: John Constable
- Year: 1810
- Type: Oil on canvas, landscape painting
- Dimensions: 44.5 cm × 35.9 cm (17.5 in × 14.1 in)
- Location: Tate Britain, London

The Church Porch, East Bergholt is an 1810 landscape painting by the British artist John Constable. It depicts a view of St. Mary's Church in the village of East Bergholt in Suffolk. Located close to the border with Essex and in the area now known as Constable Country. Constable was born in East Bergholt where his father owned Flatford Mill.

It is believed to be the first painting Constable himself submitted for the Royal Academy's Summer Exhibition, having appeared at earlier exhibitions. Today it is in the collection of the Tate Britain in Pimlico, having been donated to the nation by the artist's daughter Isabel Constable in 1888.

== Critical reception ==
Given the Royal Academy's high standards in selecting the pieces for its annual exhibition, it may be surprising that a small painting of a remote rural church would have been included, and more so, that it was placed in the Great Room, next to the best paintings.

As Nicola Moorby explains,

The eye of the viewer, however, is drawn by a bright splash of a red cloak to a group of figures in the foreground: an old man, a woman and a young girl seated amongst the tombstones. Educated contemporaries would have immediately intuited the literary reference here: Thomas Gray’s melancholy Elegy in a Country Churchyard, published in 1751, one of the most popular poems of the eighteenth century and a famous, lyrical meditation upon mortality. [...] Gray’s ‘Elegy’ was so universally beloved that it had become the progenitor of a visual tradition of picturesque graveyard scenes.

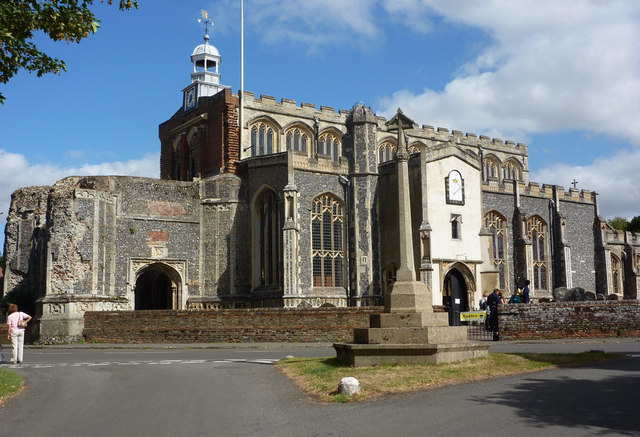
The church today. Note the sundial.

This was a very personal painting for Constable and he "was immediately able to tap into the poignancy of the theme, precisely because of his profound understanding of rural life and his own intimate connection with the graveyard of East Bergholt.", according to Moorby.

== See also ==
- List of paintings by John Constable

== Bibliography ==
- Bishop, Peter. An Archetypal Constable: National Identity and the Geography of Nostalgia. Fairleigh Dickinson University Press, 1995.
- Cove, Sarah. Constable: The Great Landscapes. Tate, 2006.
- Moorby, Nicola. Turner and Constable: Art, Life, and Landscape. Yale University Press, 2025.
