= Andrea-Salvatore Aglio =

Italian painter (1736–1786)

Andrea Salvatore di Antonio Aglio, sometimes spelled Allio (1736-1786), was an Italian painter sculptor, born in Arzo, who specialized in painting on marble.

Aglio was born in Arzo. Notes about his life are provided by the Historical Dictionary of illustrious men of the Canton Ticino, published in 1807 by Gian Alfonso Oldelli, from Meride (who personally knew the artist). Very young, in 1736, he went to Dresden where we stayed for 22 years, working as lapidary (the marble altar (1756) of the church of Borna is his work). He also dedicated to experiment marble coloration techniques, working with acids that finally resulted in his death.
