= The Coronation of Napoleon =

1807 painting by Jacques-Louis David

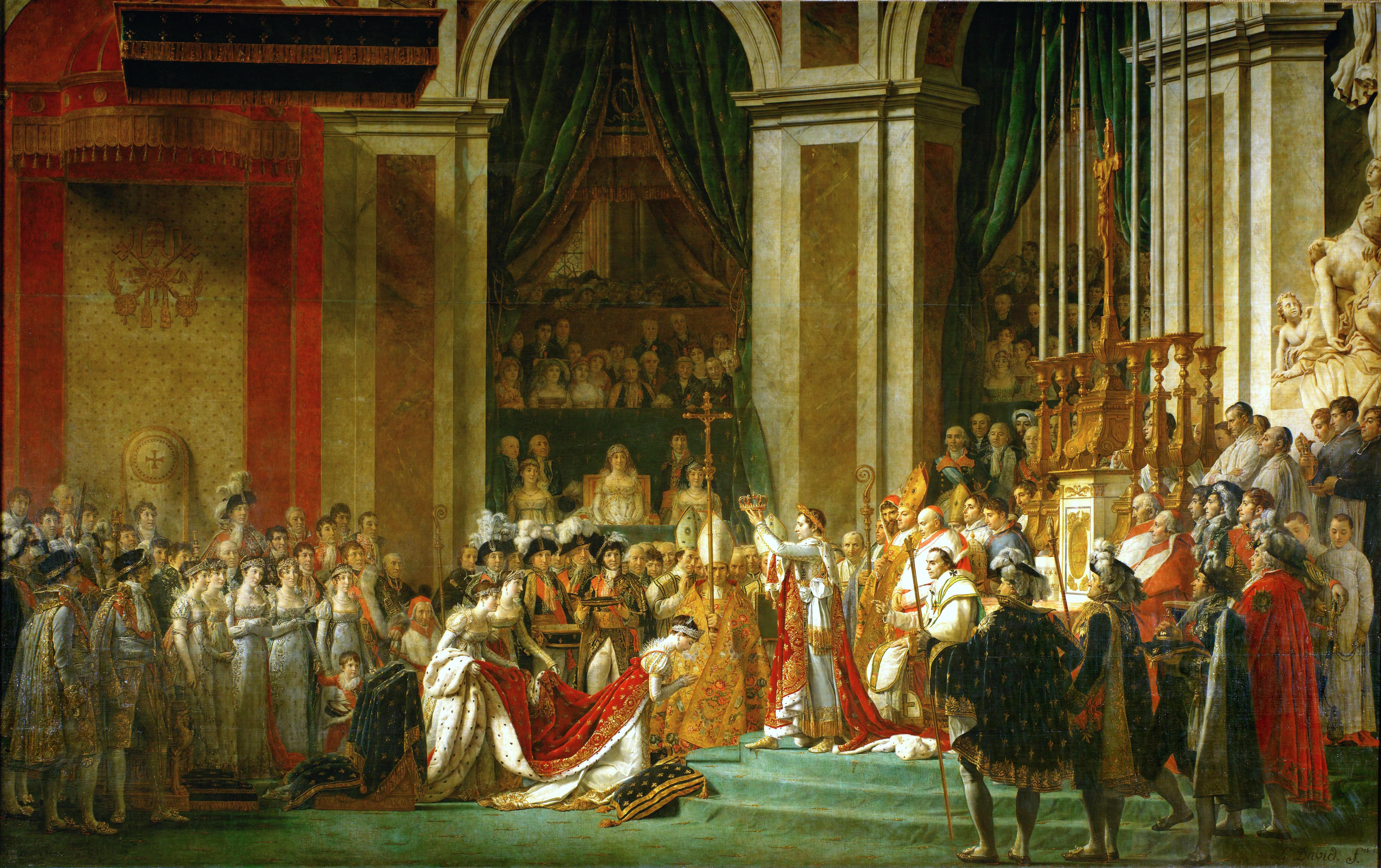
- Artist: Jacques-Louis David
- Year: 1805–07 (exhibited 1808)
- Medium: Oil on canvas
- Dimensions: 6.21 m × 9.79 m (20 ft 4 in × 32 ft 1 in)
- Location: Louvre; Paris

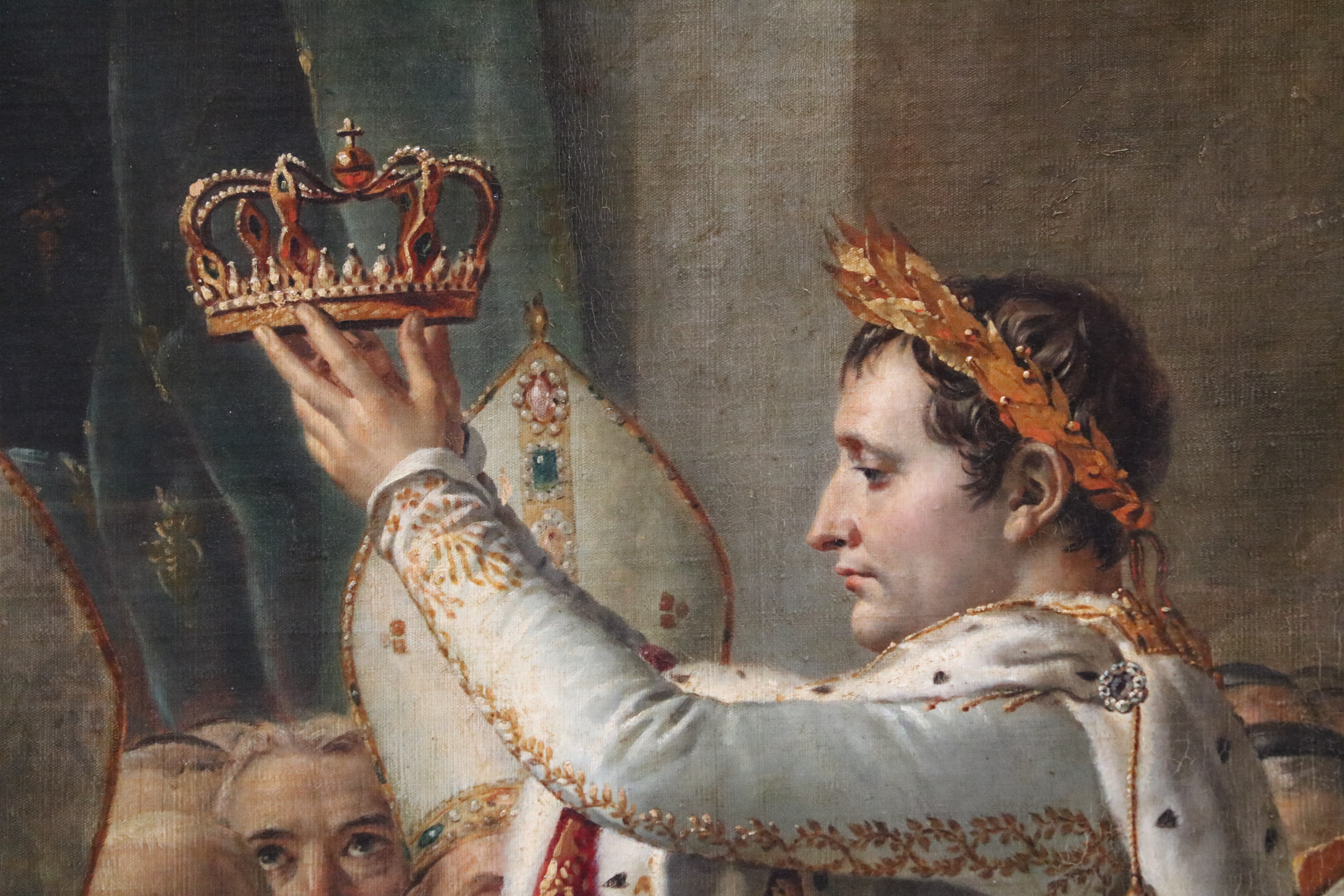
Detail, Napoleon crowning his wife.

The Coronation of Napoleon (Note: The full official title is Consecration of the Emperor Napoleon I and Coronation of the Empress Josephine in the Cathedral of Notre-Dame de Paris on 2 December 1804.) (French: Le Sacre de Napoléon) is a painting completed in 1807 by Jacques-Louis David, the official painter of Napoleon, depicting the coronation of Napoleon at Notre-Dame de Paris. The oil painting has imposing dimensions – it is almost 10 metres (33 ft) wide by a little over 6 metres (20 ft) tall. The work is on display at the Louvre Museum in Paris, France.

== History of the work ==
The work was commissioned by Napoleon orally in September 1804, and Jacques-Louis David started work on it on 21 December 1805 in the former chapel of the College of Cluny, near the Sorbonne, which served as a workshop. Assisted by his student Georges Rouget, he put the finishing touches in January 1808.

From 7 February to 22 March 1808, the work was exhibited at the Salon of 1808 at the Louvre, and it was presented to the Salon decennial prize competition at the Salon of 1810. The painting remained the property of David until 1819 when it was transferred to the Royal Museums, where it was stored in the reserves until 1837. It was subsequently installed in the Chamber Sacre of the museum of the historical Palace of Versailles on the orders of King Louis-Philippe. In 1889, the painting was transferred to the Louvre from Versailles.

David was commissioned by American entrepreneurs to paint a full size replica in 1808, immediately after the release of the original. He began work that year, painting it from memory, but didn't finish until 1822 during his exile in Brussels. The replica was eventually returned to France in 1947 to the original's place in the Palace of Versailles.

The painting is a subject of The Public Viewing David's 'Coronation' at the Louvre, a painting by Louis-Léopold Boilly done in 1810, in the collection of the Metropolitan Museum of Art in New York.

== Composition ==
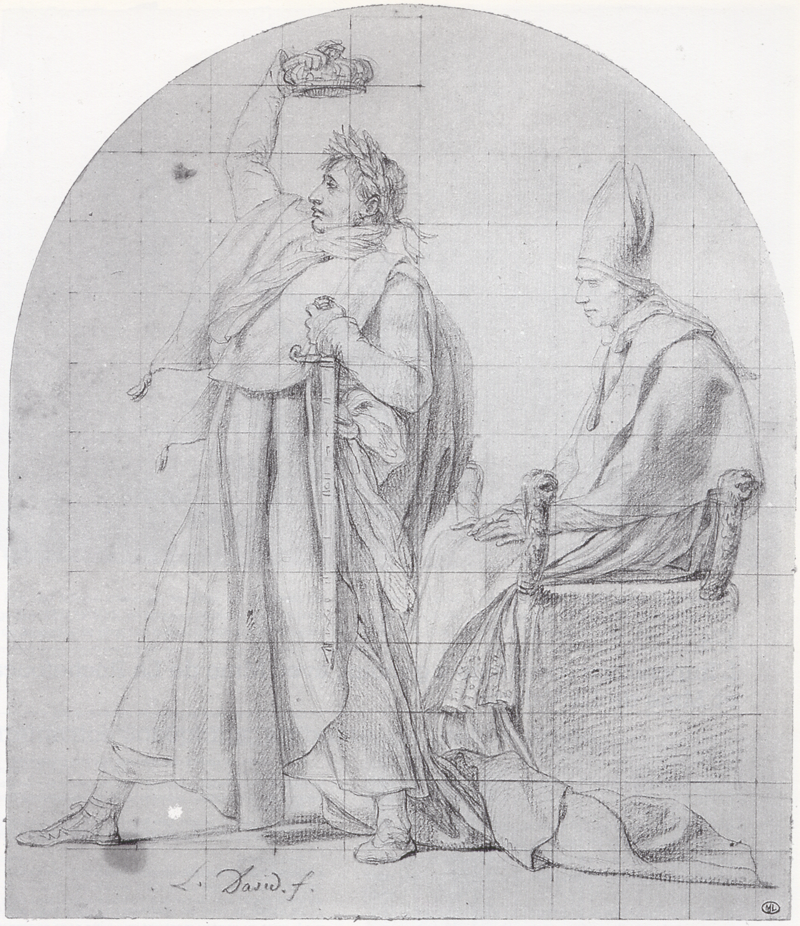
Sketch by David of Napoleon crowning himself.

The composition is organized around several axes, and incorporates the rules of neoclassicism. One axis is that which passes through the cross and has a vertical orientation. A diagonal line runs from the pope to the empress. All eyes are turned towards Napoleon, who is the center of the composition. Napoleon, Pius, and Josephine are illustrated in profile upon the steps towards the altar. The Emblem of the Holy See is hung above the attendants to the left while La Pietà de Notre-Dame de Paris is partially seen at the rightmost edge of the canvas.

== Characters ==
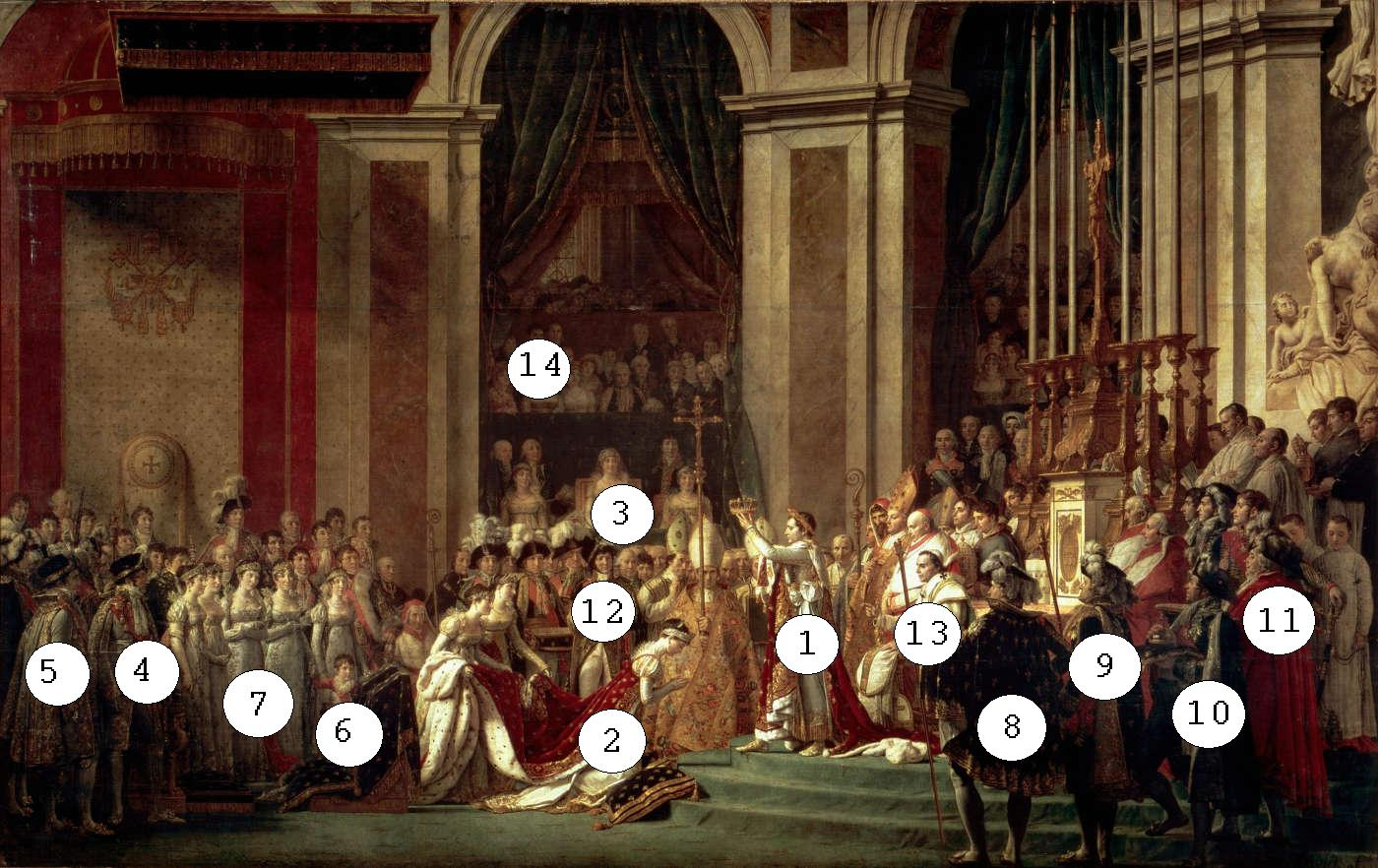
The characters in the painting.

1. Napoleon I (1769–1821) is standing, dressed in coronation robes similar to those of Roman emperors. Others are merely passive spectators. In the actual painting, it is possible to see the outline of what was originally painted: Napoleon holding the crown above his own head, as if placing it on himself.
2. Joséphine de Beauharnais (1763–1814) is kneeling in a submissive position, as called for in the French Civil Code. She received the crown from the hands of her husband, not the pope. Her robe is decorated with silk and was possibly intended to convey support of the Lyon silk manufacturers the Revolution had harmed.
3. Maria Letizia Ramolino (1750–1836), mother of Napoleon, was placed in the stands by the painter. She occupies a place more important than the pope. Actually, she did not attend the ceremony in order to protest the friction of Napoleon with his brothers, Lucien and Joseph. Maria Letizia asked the painter to give Lucien a place of honour. In 1808, when Napoleon discovered the canvas completed in the workshop of David, he was enthralled and expressed his gratitude.
4. Louis Bonaparte (1778–1846), who in 1806, at the beginning of the Empire, received the title of grand constable, King of Holland. He married Hortense de Beauharnais, the daughter of Josephine.
5. Joseph Bonaparte (1768–1844), who, after the coronation, received the title of Prince Imperial. Afterwards, he was King of Naples in 1806 and Spain in 1808.
6. The young Napoleon Charles Bonaparte (1802–1807), son of Louis Bonaparte and Hortense de Beauharnais.
7. The sisters of Napoleon. In the replica, the dress of Napoleon's favorite sister is pink. This is the only change in the replica, despite it having been painted from memory.
8. Charles-Francois Lebrun (1739–1824), the third consul alongside Napoleon and Cambacérès. Under the First Empire he took the place of prince-architrésorier. He holds the sceptre.
9. Jean Jacques Régis de Cambacérès (1753–1824), arch-chancellor prince of the empire. He takes the hand of justice.
10. Louis-Alexandre Berthier (1753–1815), minister of war under the Consulate. Marshal of the Empire in 1805. He keeps the globe surmounted by a cross.
11. Talleyrand (1754–1836), grand chamberlain since July 11, 1804.
12. Joachim Murat (1767–1815), Marshal of the Empire, king of Naples after 1808, brother-in-law of Napoleon, and husband of Caroline Bonaparte.
13. Pope Pius VII (1742–1823), who was content to bless the coronation. He is surrounded by clerics, appointed by Napoleon since the Concordat. In order to reinforce the legitimacy of his regime following the Concordat of 1801, Napoleon invited Pope Pius VII to attend the coronation, which the Pope agreed to do. David's preparatory studies first rendered figures with minimal detail, as was a staple of the artist’s working process. Napoleon closely supervised the final composition, and the depiction of Pius VII was adjusted to show him raising his hand in a gesture of blessing, emphasizing his solely ceremonial role in the event.
14. The painter Jacques-Louis David is depicted in the stands as well.
15. Halet Efendi, an Ottoman ambassador, was also present. He is shown below in the detailed picture.
16. Dom Raphaël de Monachis, a Greek-Egyptian monk and member of the Institut d'Égypte, is depicted among the clergymen, standing to the right of the Bishop, with a beard and a red hood.
17. The female robe bearer in front, right behind Josephine, on the right side from the viewer's point of view, is Elisabeth-Hélène-Pierre de Montmorency-Laval, mother of politician Sosthènes II de La Rochefoucauld. She was a court lady of Josephine.

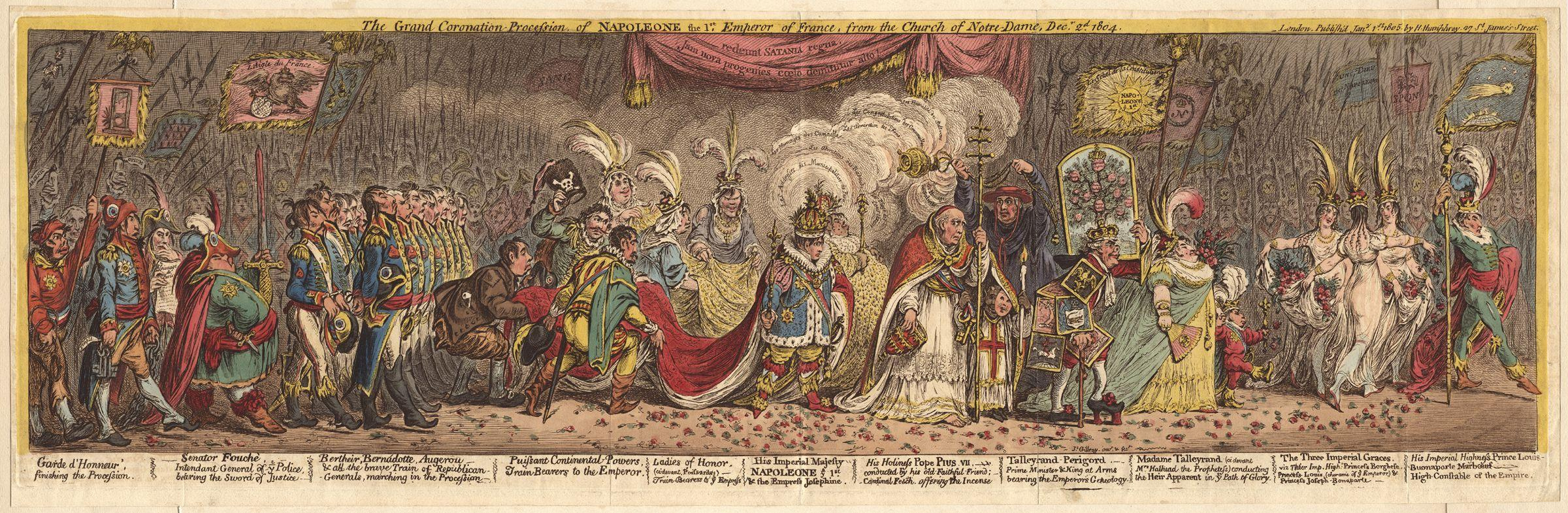
Cartoon by James Gillray mocking the coronation

== In popular culture ==
The 2023 Ridley Scott film Napoleon recreated the painting in the scene depicting the coronation of Napoleon. The scene in the film included a shot of Jacques-Louis David drawing a sketch of the coronation for the painting.

== See also ==
- List of paintings by Jacques-Louis David

== Bibliography ==
- Malika Dorbani-Bouabdellah, The largest French paintings in the Louvre
- Jean Tulard, Le Sacre de l'empereur Napoléon. Histoire et légende, Paris 2004 ISBN 2-213-62098-9
