= Christopher Barber (painter) =

English painter

Christopher Barber (1736–1810) was an English miniature painter.

== Life ==
Barber exhibited in the Royal Academy in 1770. He worked in crayons as well as oil, and continued to be an occasional exhibitor, chiefly of portraits and half-lengths, in the Royal Academy until 1792. His portraits were celebrated for peculiar brilliancy, in consequence of the especial attention he devoted to the preparation of magilp.

An enthusiastic lover of music, he was distinguished for a particular acquaintance with the works of Handel and Purcell, while his social gifts gathered a large and warm circle of acquaintance round him. He was for some time a member of the Incorporated Society of Artists, but his exhibiting with the opposing society, which was incorporated as the Royal Academy in 1768, led to his forced withdrawal in 1765. He was long resident in St Martin's Lane, but later moved to Great Marylebone Street, where he died, in 1810.

== Sources ==
- This article incorporates text from a publication now in the public domain: Dawkins, Clinton Edward (1885). "Barber, Christopher". In Stephen, Leslie (ed.). Dictionary of National Biography. Vol. 3. London: Smith, Elder & Co.
