= Georges Rouget =

French painter (1783–1869)

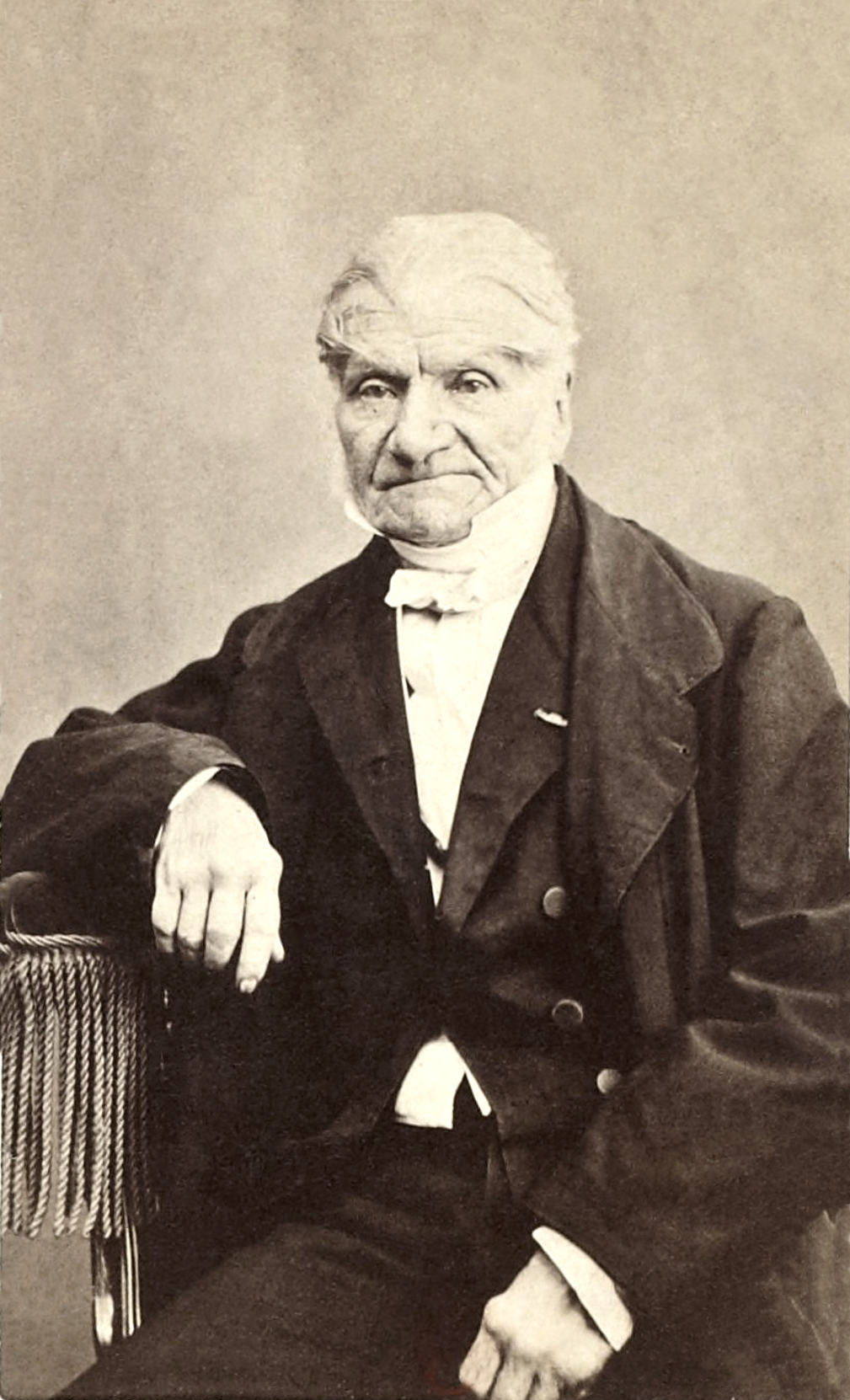
- Rouget by Nadar, 1865
- Born: Marie-Georges-Louis Rouget; 26 August 1783; Paris, France
- Died: 9 April 1869 (aged 85); Paris, France
- Education: École des beaux-arts de Paris, then studio of David
- Known for: Painting
- Notable work: Marriage of Napoleon and Marie-Louise, Portrait of David
- Movement: Neoclassicism
- Awards: Second Prix de Rome (1803), Knight of the Légion d'honneur

Marie-Georges-Louis Rouget (French: [ʒɔʁʒ ʁuʒɛ]; 26 August 1783 – 9 April 1869) was a French neoclassical painter.

== Life ==
After studying in the École des Beaux-Arts, Rouget entered David's studio in 1797 and rapidly became his favorite student. Rouget began his professional career as his master's main assistant until David's exile to Brussels, collaborating with him on the canvases Bonaparte at the Grand-Saint-Bernard, The Coronation of Napoleon (of which he made a copy signed by David), Leonidas at Thermopylae and on one of the three copies of the Portrait of Pope Pius VII. Though he won the second prize in the Prix de Rome contest in 1803, he failed three times to win the first prize. He produced many canvases for the First French Empire and the Bonapartes, such as The Marriage of Napoleon and Marie Louise in 1811. His career spanned several regimes, and he produced numerous paintings of great moments in French history, often at the behest of the government. Many of his paintings adorned the Musée de Versailles opened by Louis-Philippe in 1837.

== Gallery ==
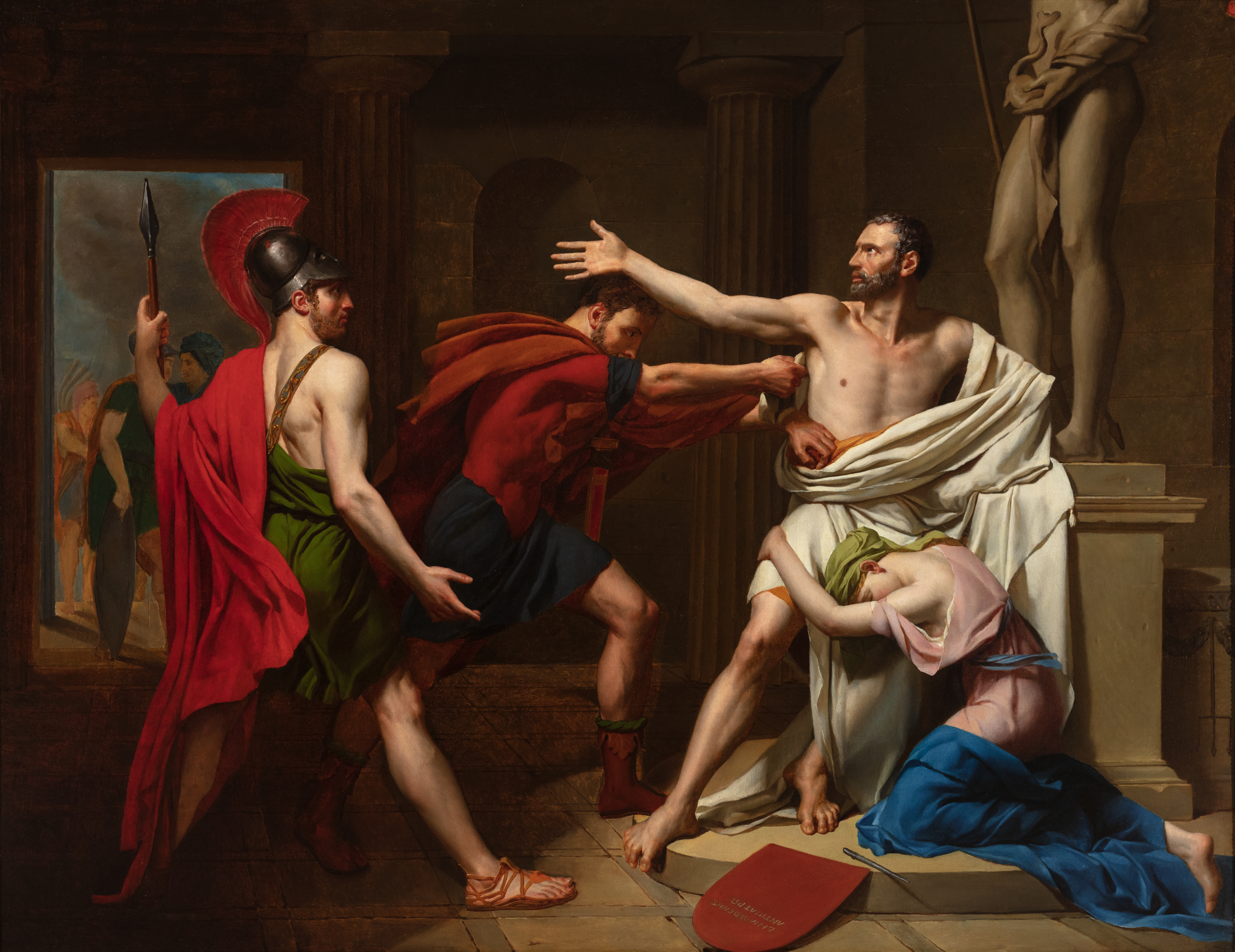
Death of Demosthenes (1805)

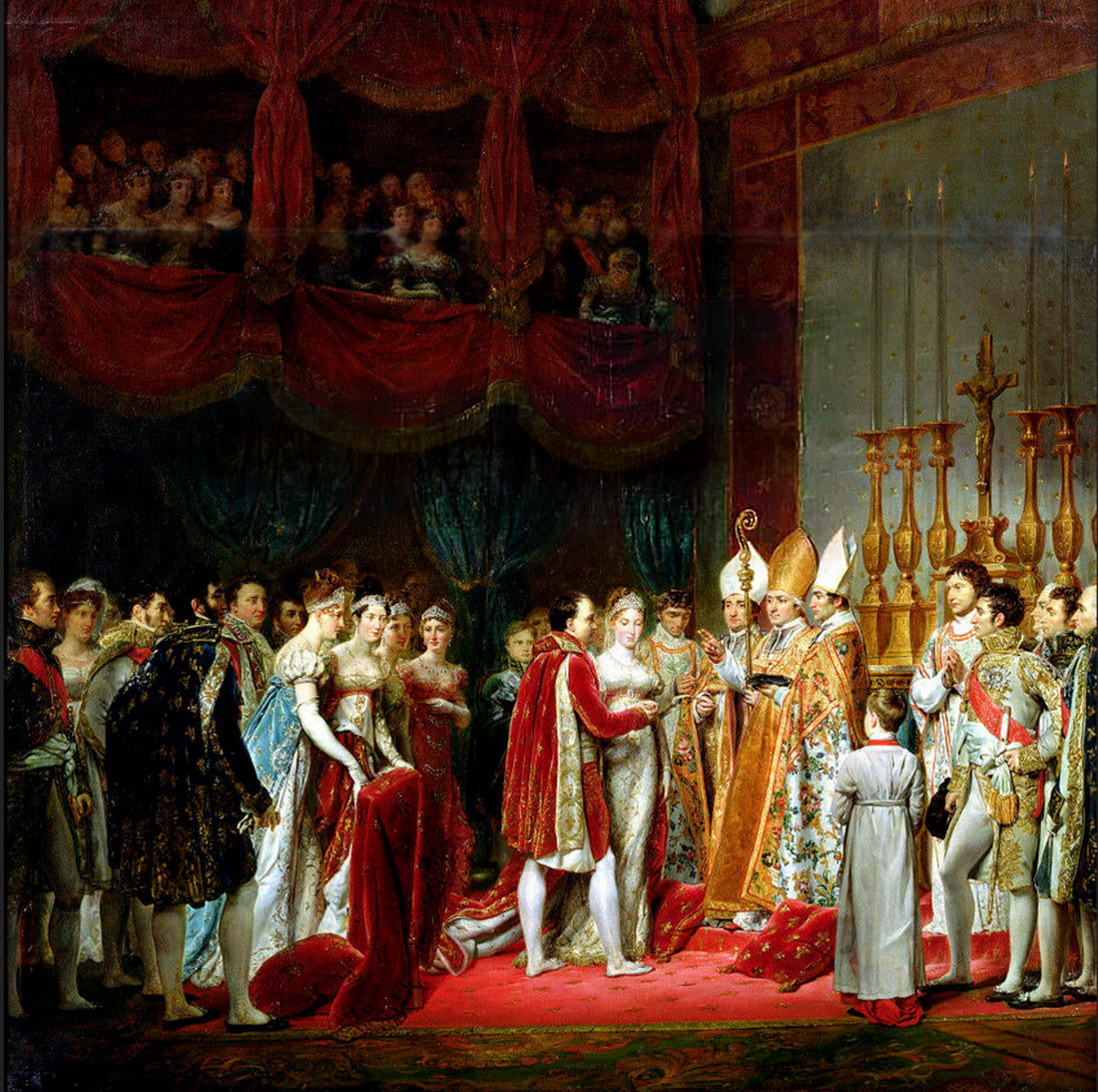
The Wedding of Napoleon and Marie Louise (1810)

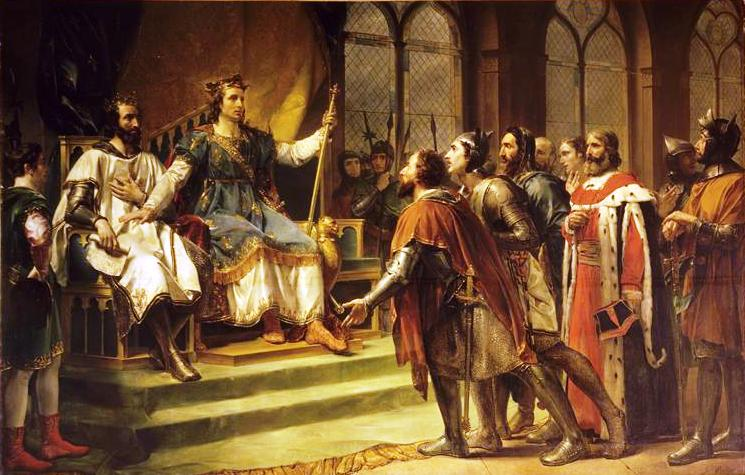
Saint Louis Mediating Between the King of England and His Barons (1822)

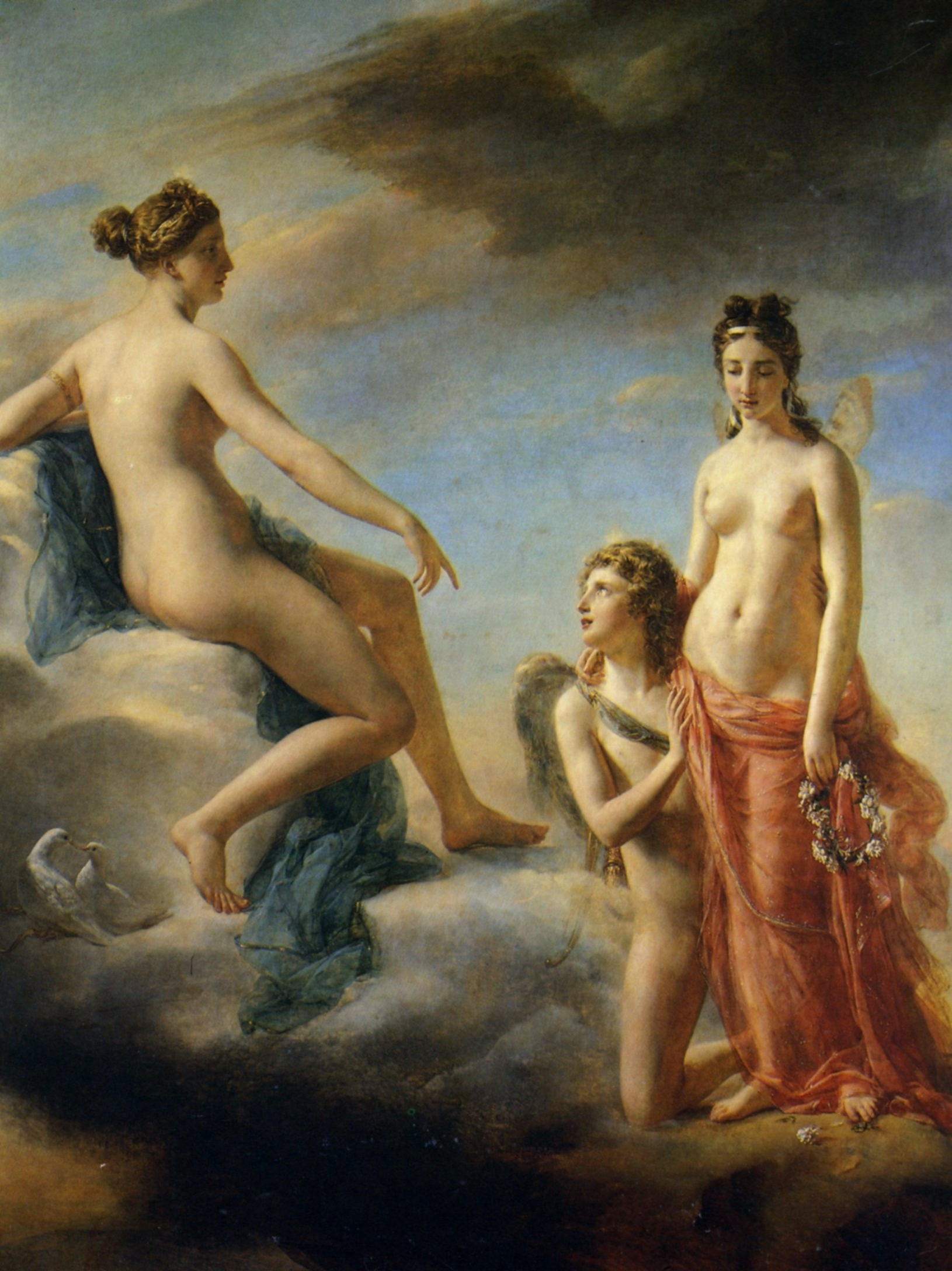
Cupid Pleading Venus to Forgive Psyche (1827)

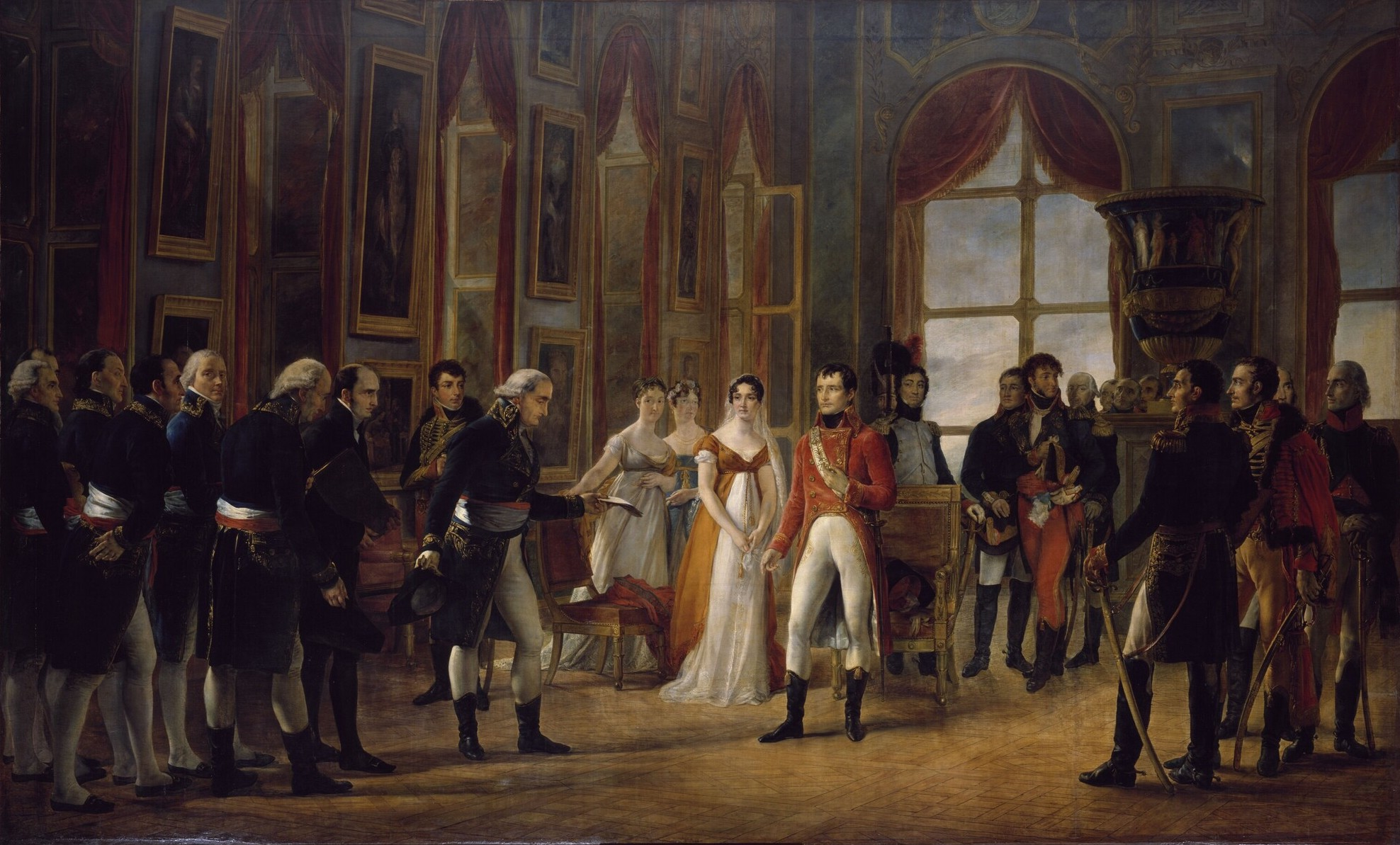
Napoleon Receiving the Senate at Saint-Cloud to be Proclaimed Emperor (1837)

== Bibliography ==
- Media related to Georges Rouget at Wikimedia Commons
- (in French) Alain Pougetoux, Georges Rouget, élève de Louis David (exhibition catalogue), Musée de la Vie romantique, ed. Paris Musées Paris 1995, ISBN 2-87900-234-6
