= Charlie Is My Darling =

Charlie Is My Darling may refer to:

- "Charlie Is My Darling" (song), one of several traditional Scots songs
- Charlie Is My Darling (painting), an 1864 painting by John Everett Millais
- Charlie Is My Darling (film), a 1966 film about The Rolling Stones

== See also ==
- Barney Is My Darling, a 1960s British television sitcom
