= Royal Academy Exhibition of 1864 =

1864 art exhibition in London

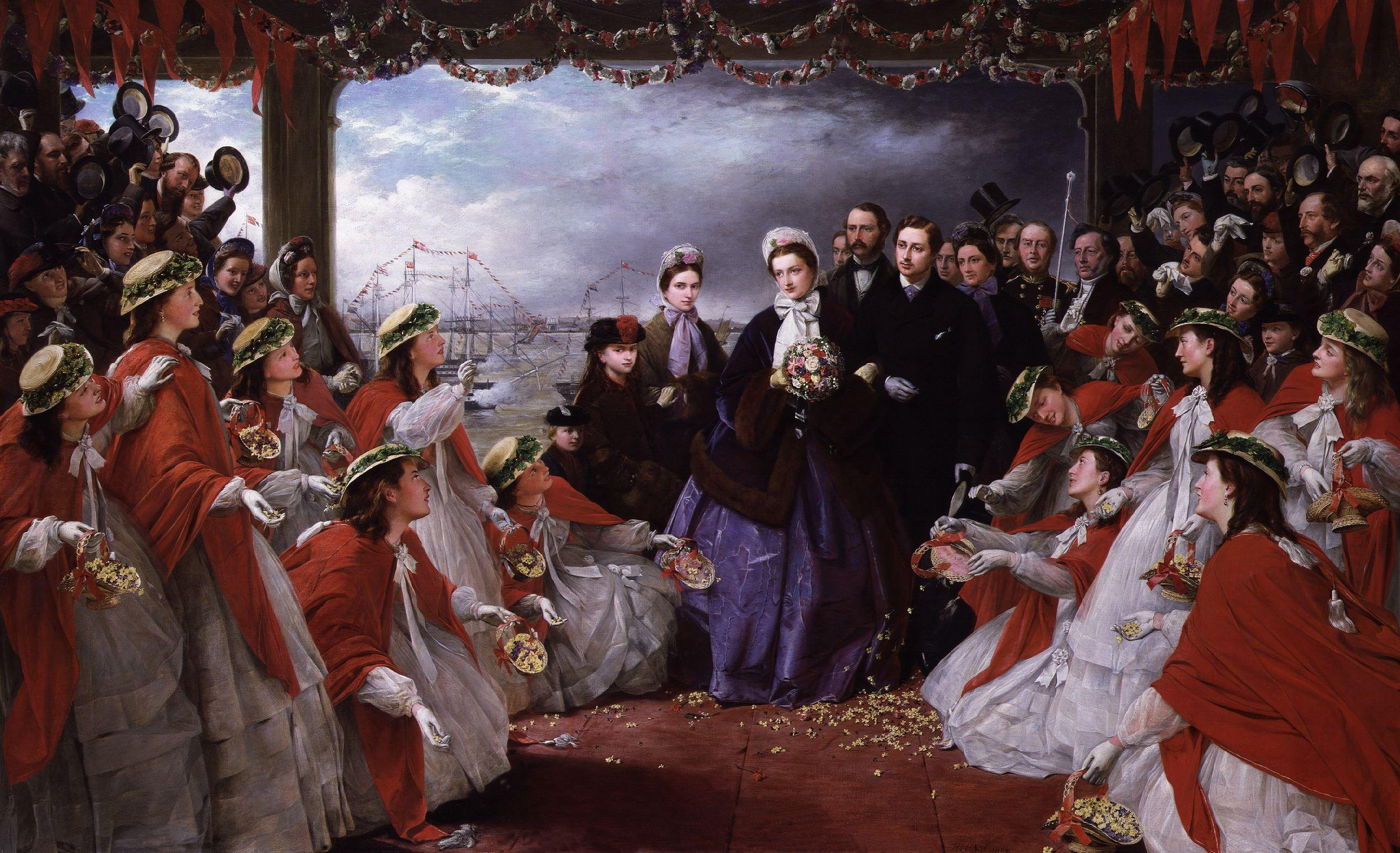
The Landing of Princess Alexandra at Gravesend by Henry Nelson O'Neil

The Royal Academy Exhibition of 1864 was the ninety sixth Summer Exhibition of the British Royal Academy of Arts. It was held at the National Gallery on Trafalgar Square in London between 2 May and 30 July 1864. It took place during the Victorian era and featured many prominent artists and sculptors of the period, although there were several notable absentees including Daniel Maclise who was busy working on his mural for the Palace of Westminster. This left an opening for rising artists of the younger generation to make their mark.

Henry Nelson O'Neil exhibited his royal commission The Landing of Princess Alexandra at Gravesend, commemorating the wedding of the Prince of Wales and Princess Alexandra the previous year. William Powell Frith was too busy working on his own painting The Marriage of the Prince of Wales, commissioned by Queen Victoria, to send in anything to the Royal Academy.

Edwin Landseer's Man Proposes, God Disposes displayed an Arctic maritime disaster, inspired by Franklin's lost expedition that perished during the search for the Northwest Passage. French artist James Tissot exhibited the work At the Break of Day.

== Gallery ==
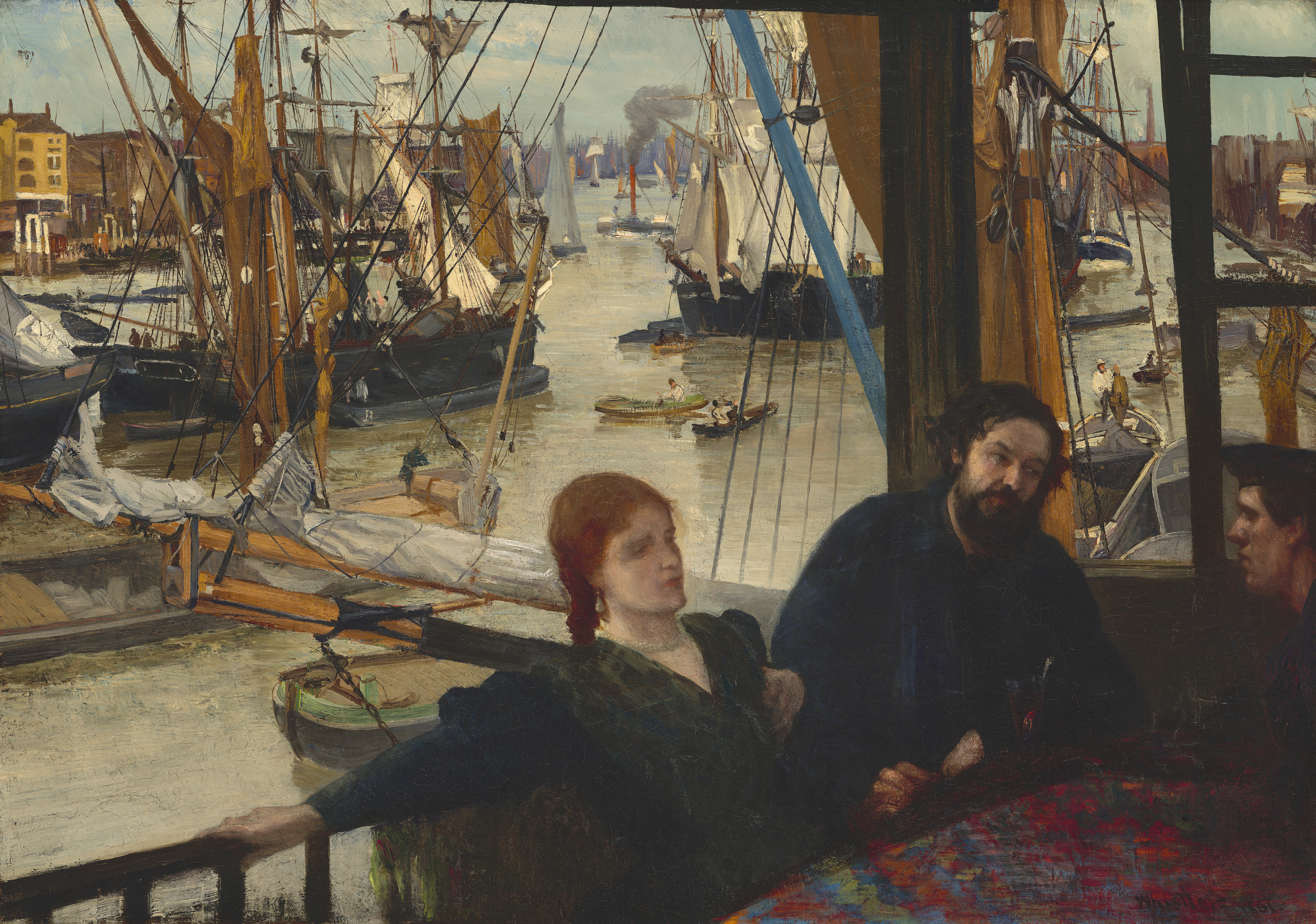
Wapping by James McNeill Whistler

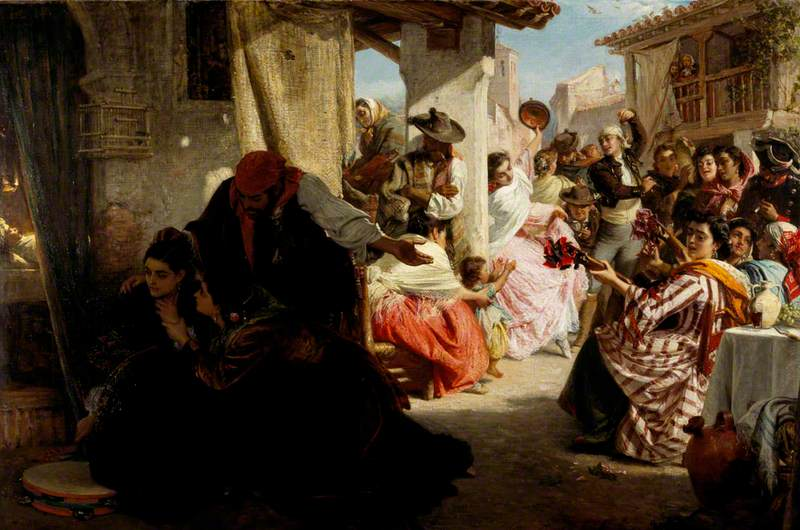
La Gloria by John Phillip

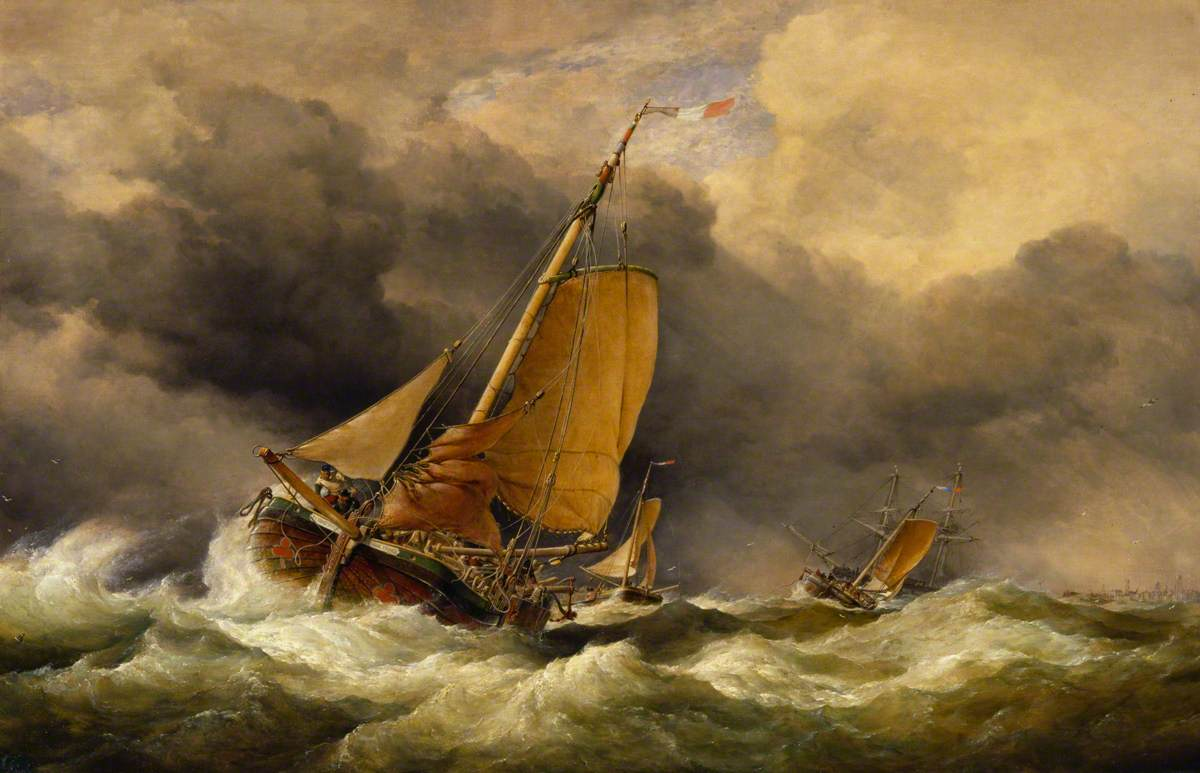
Scheveningen Pincks off the Coast of Yarmouth by Edward William Cooke

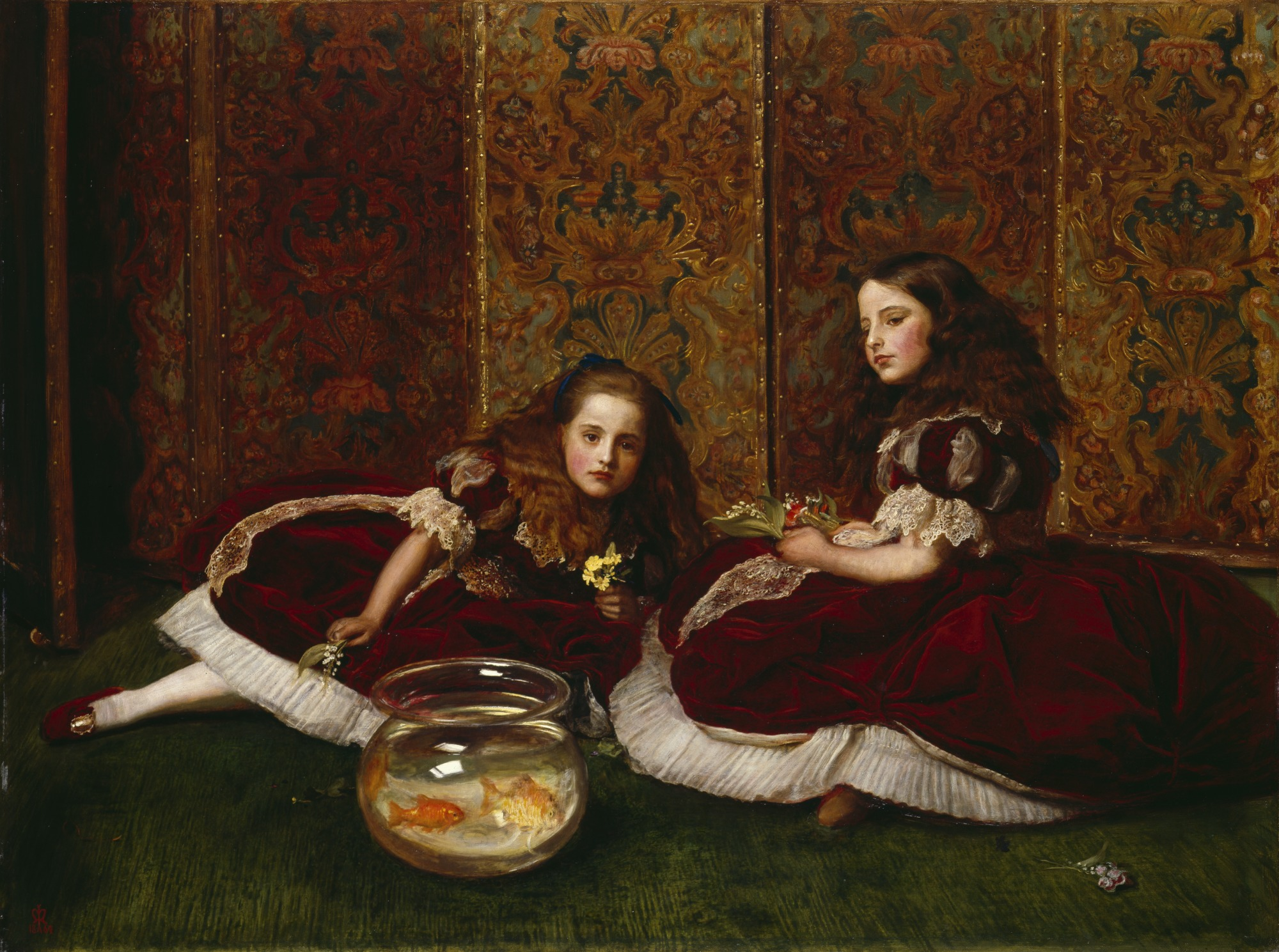
Leisure Hours by John Everett Millais

Charlie Is My Darling by John Everett Millais

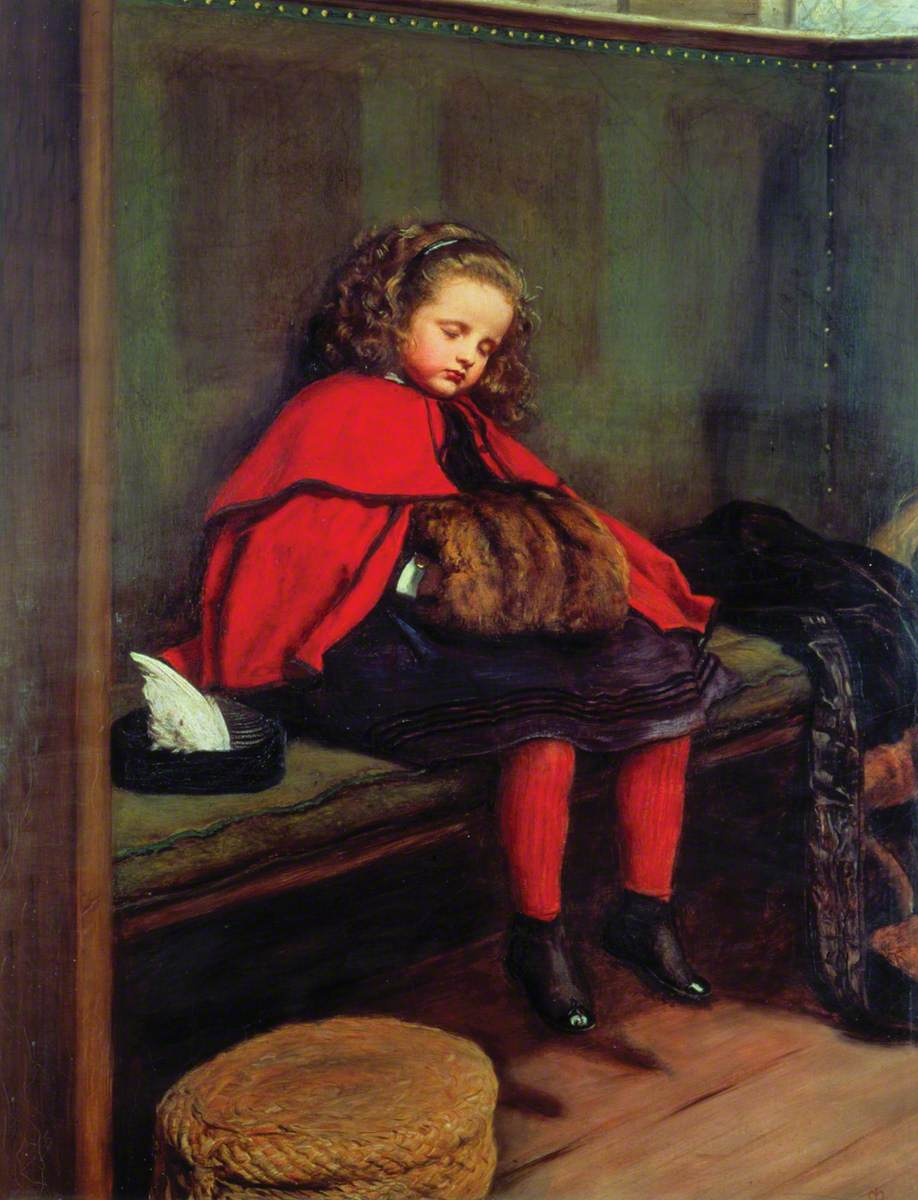
My Second Sermon by John Everett Millais

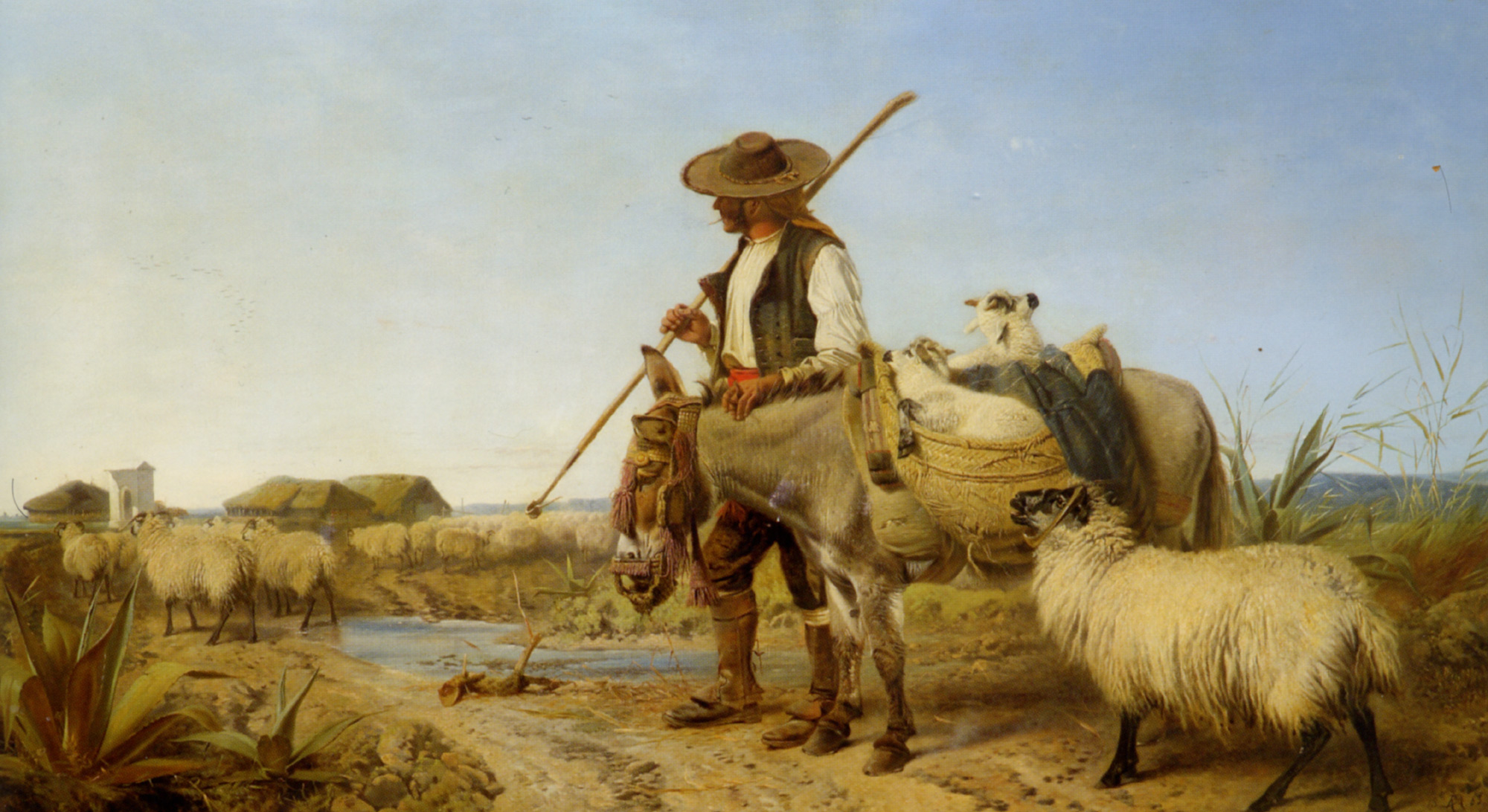
A Spanish Shepherd by Richard Ansdell

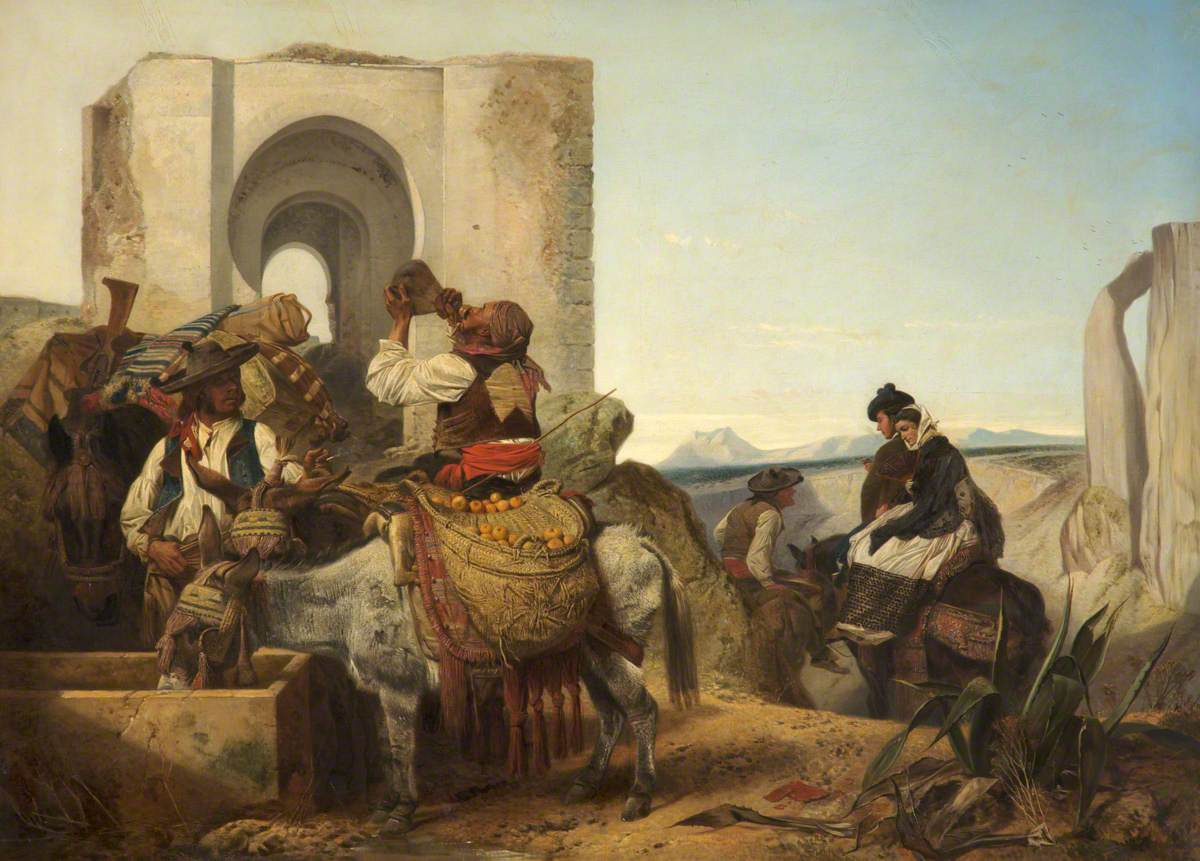
Ronda, Spanish Travellers by Richard Ansdell

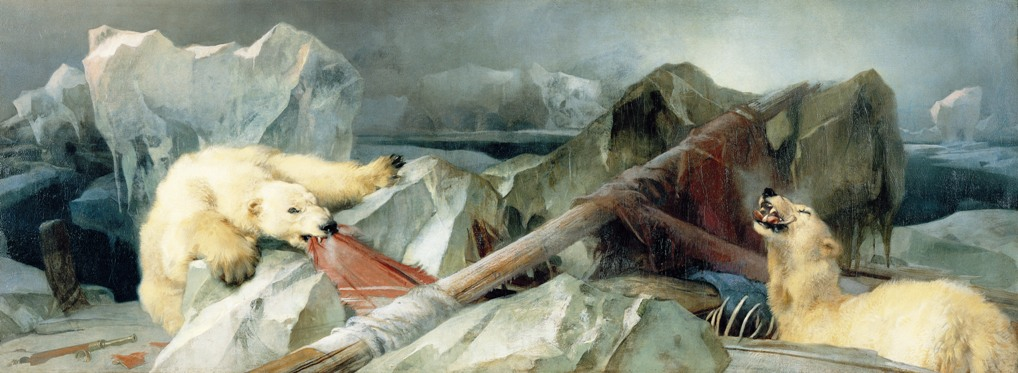
Man Proposes, God Disposes by Edwin Landseer

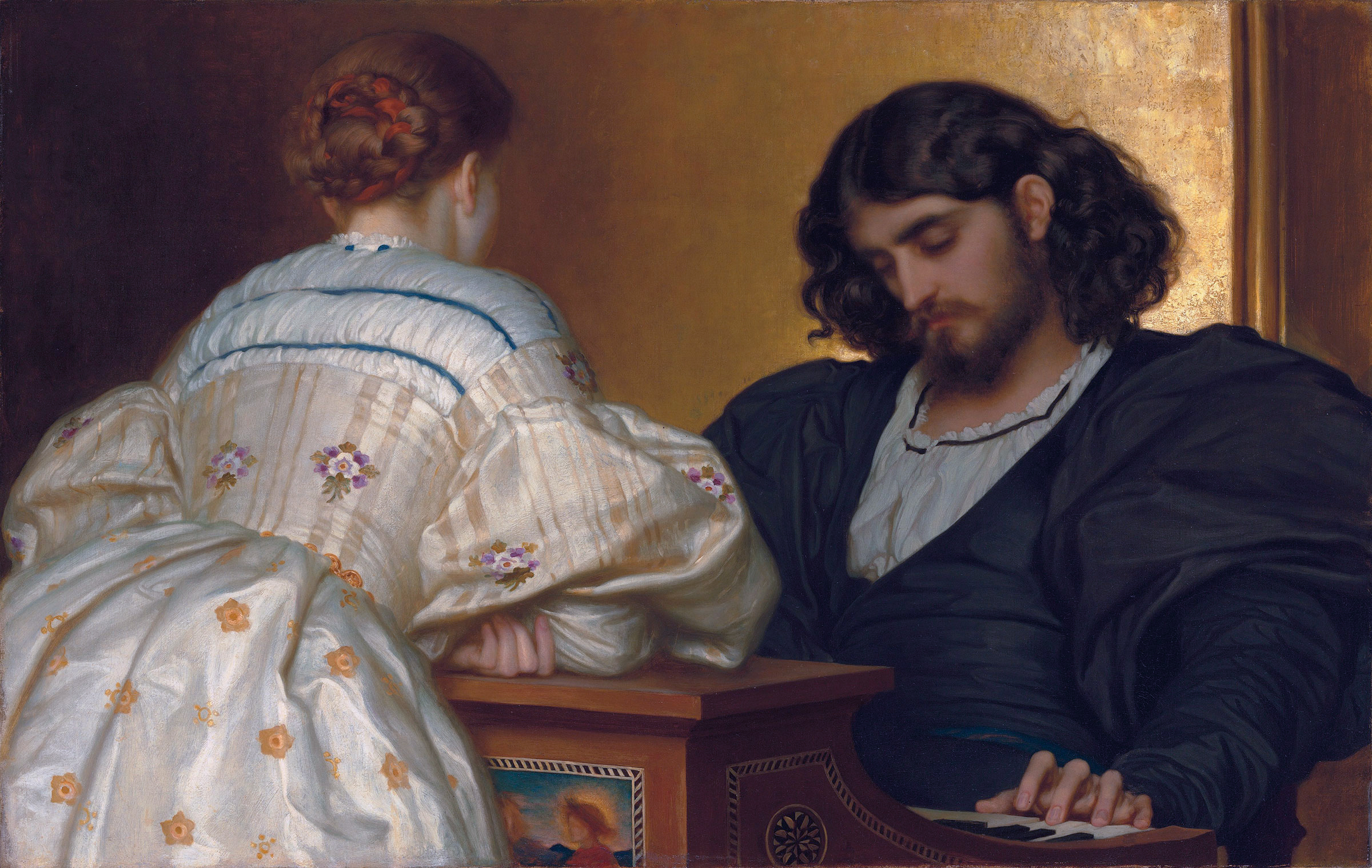
Golden Hours by Frederic Leighton

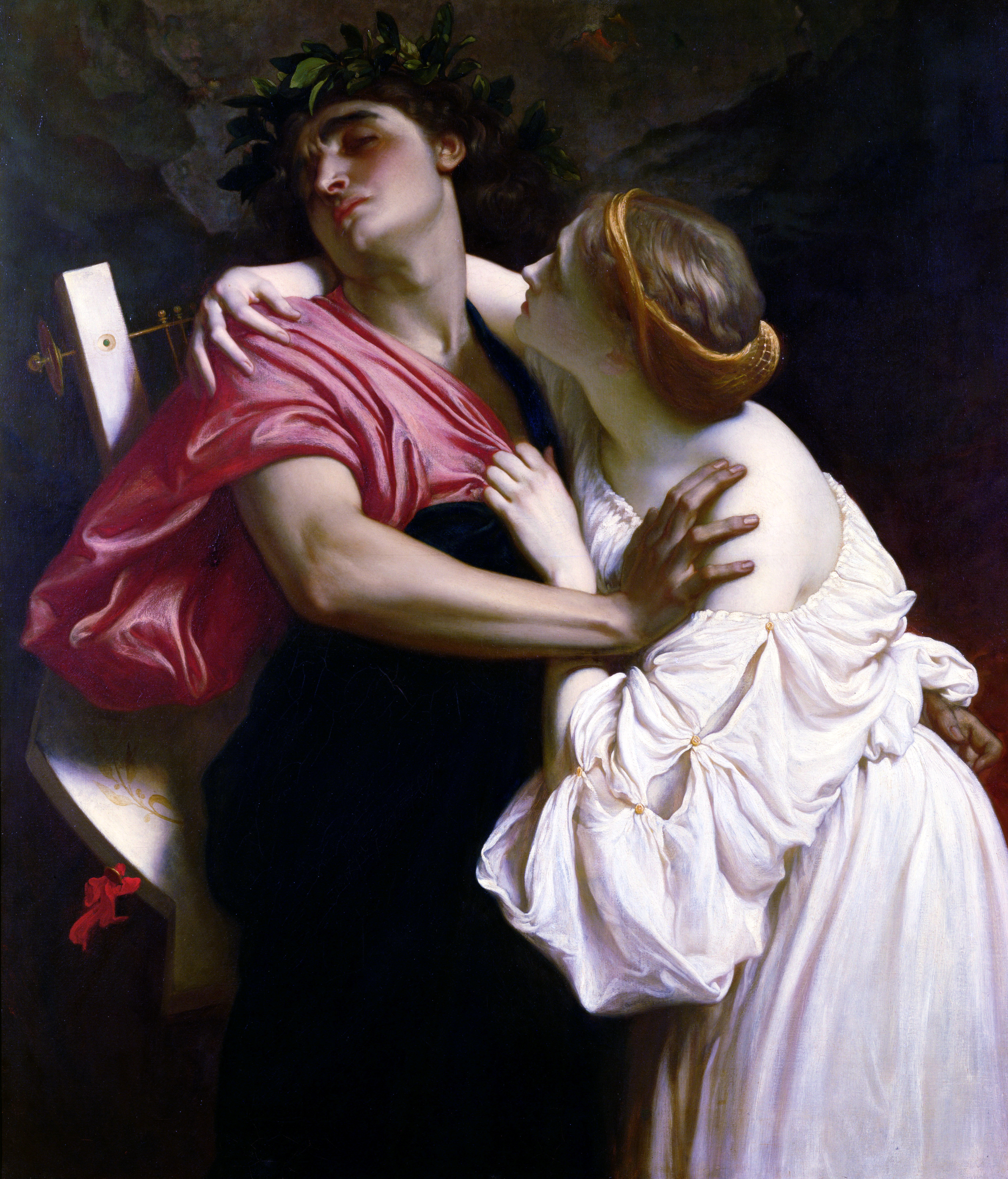
Orpheus and Eurydice by Frederic Leighton

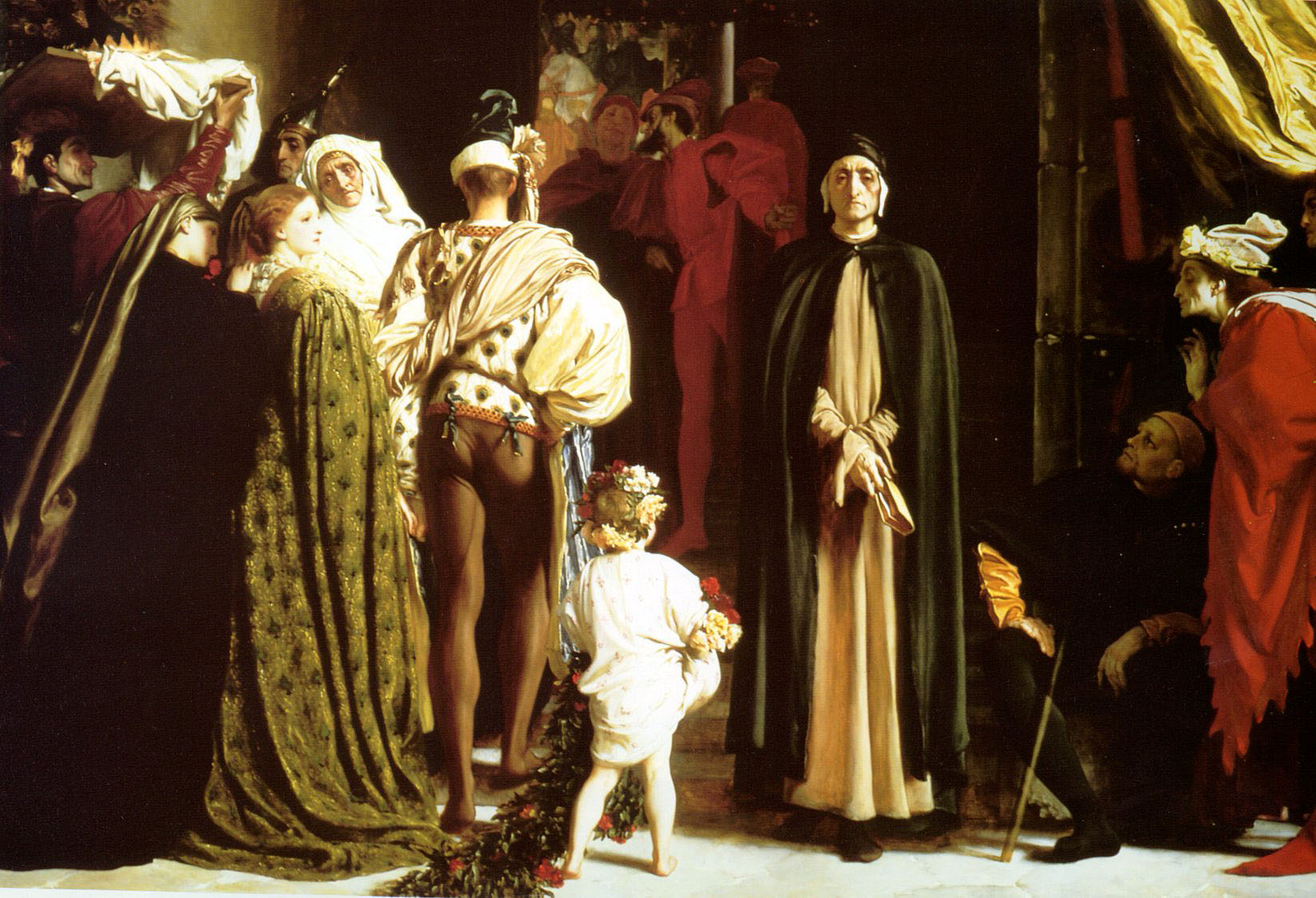
Dante in Exile by Frederic Leighton

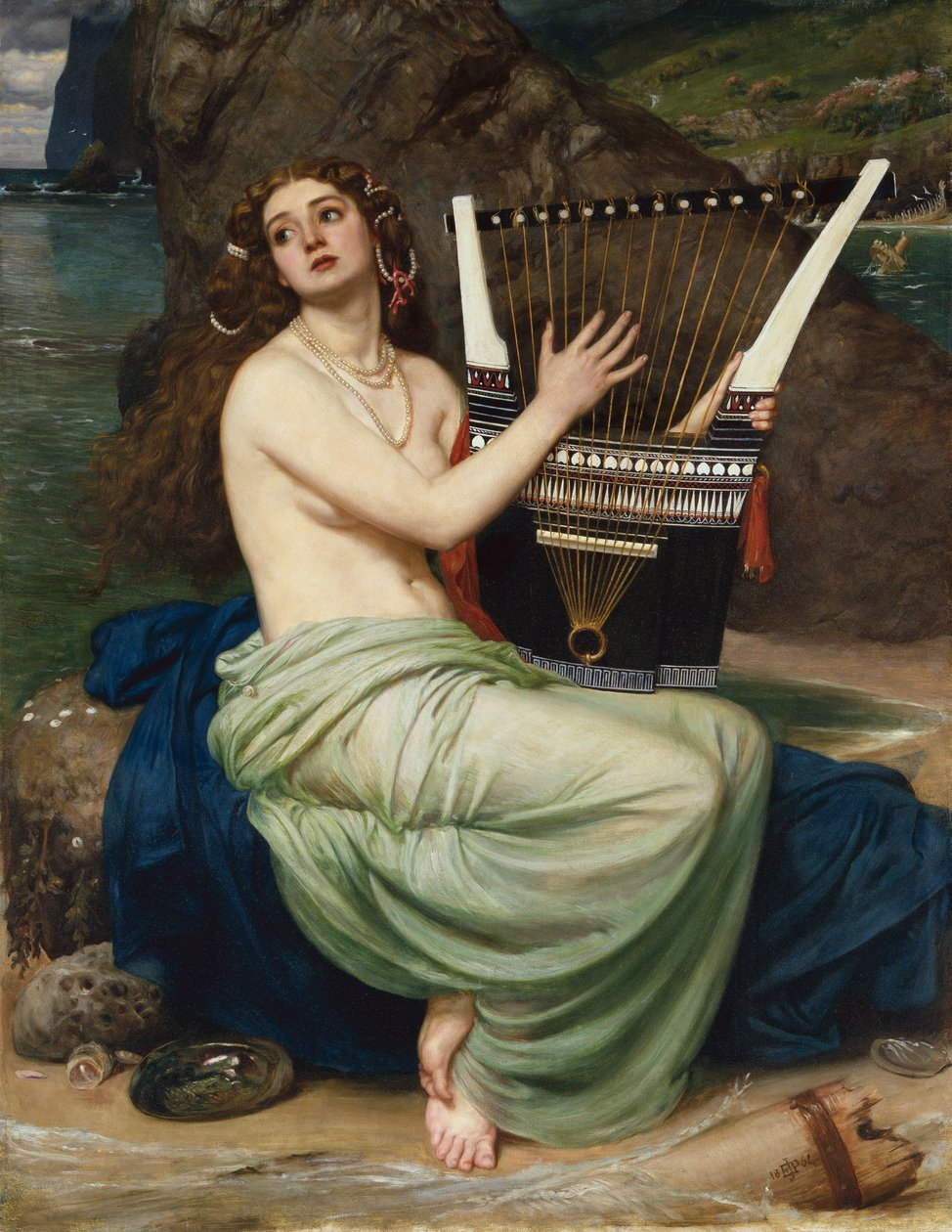
The Siren by Edward Poynter

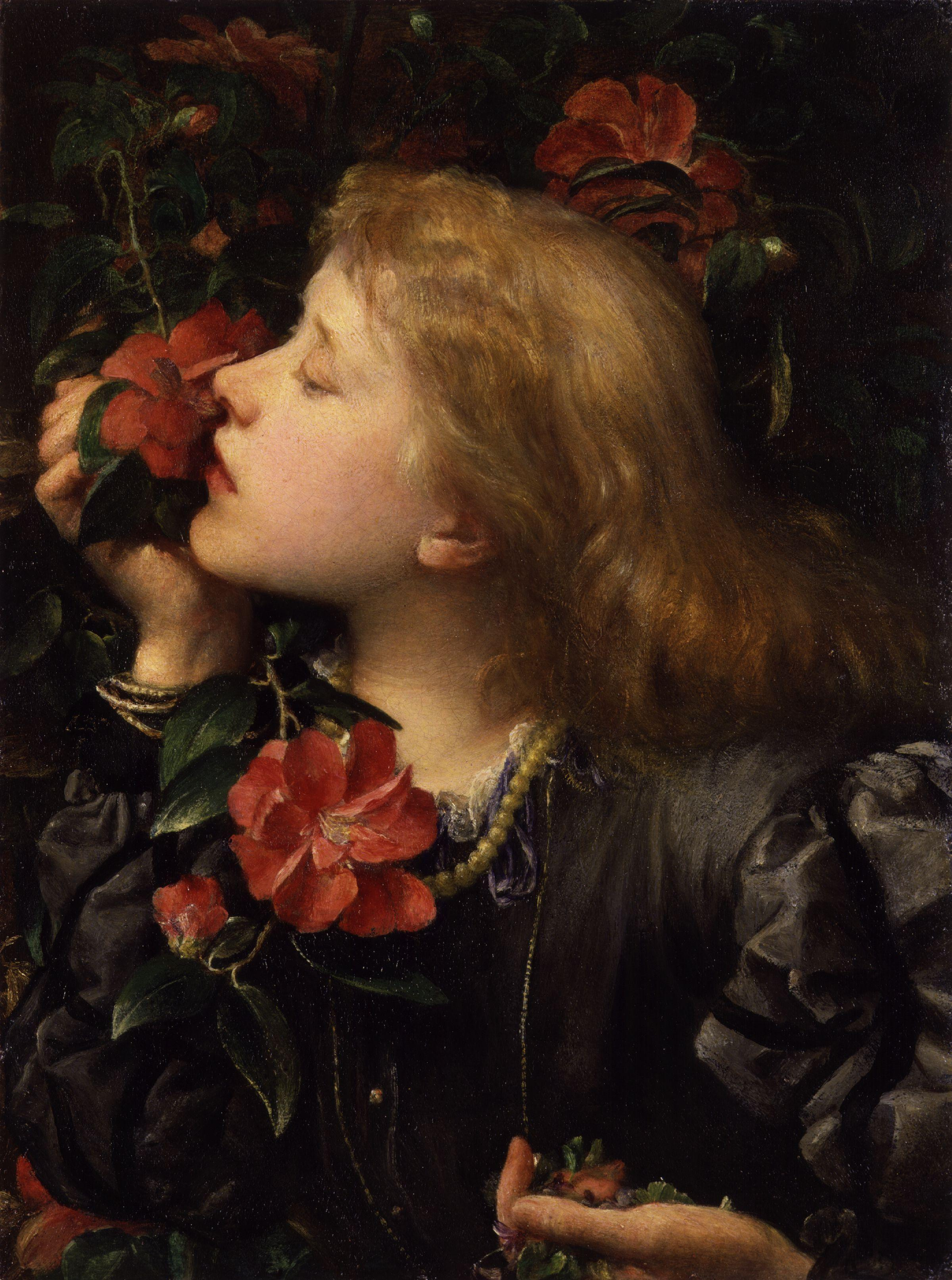
Choosing by George Frederic Watts

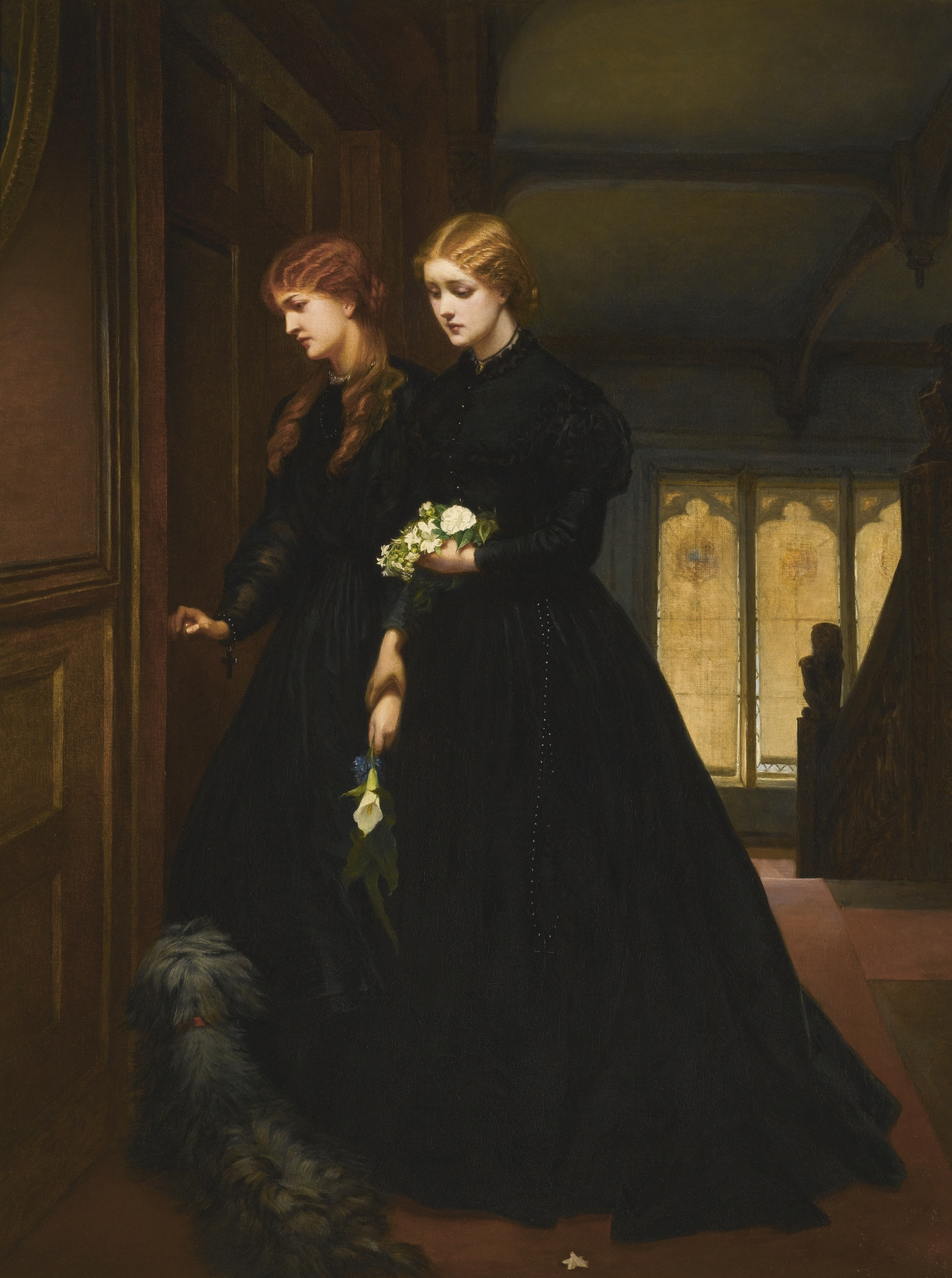
For the Last Time by Emily Mary Osborn

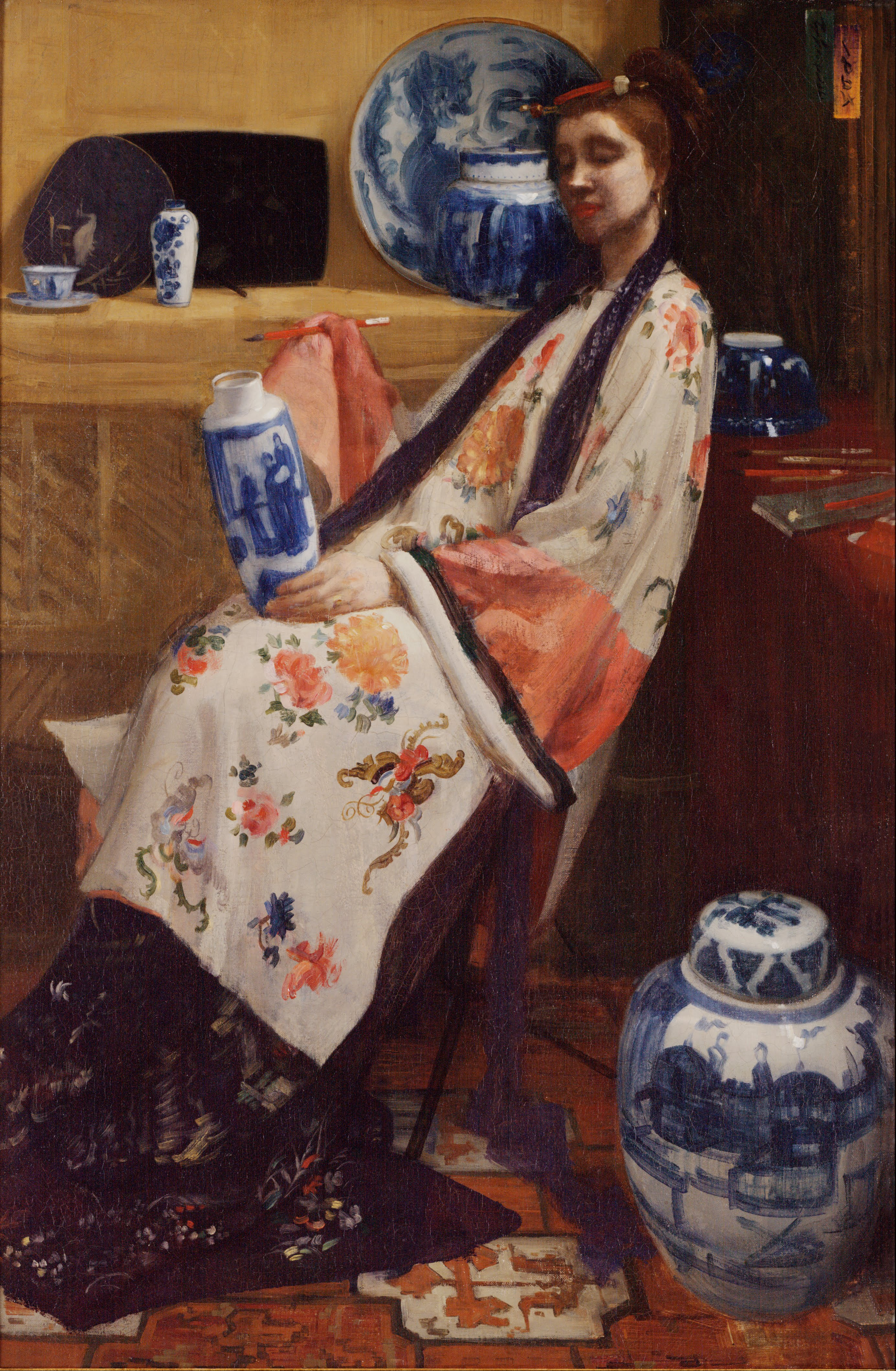
Purple and Rose by James McNeill Whistler

Morgan le Fay by Frederick Sandys

Luther Pinning His Theses to the Church Door of Wittenberg by Eyre Crowe

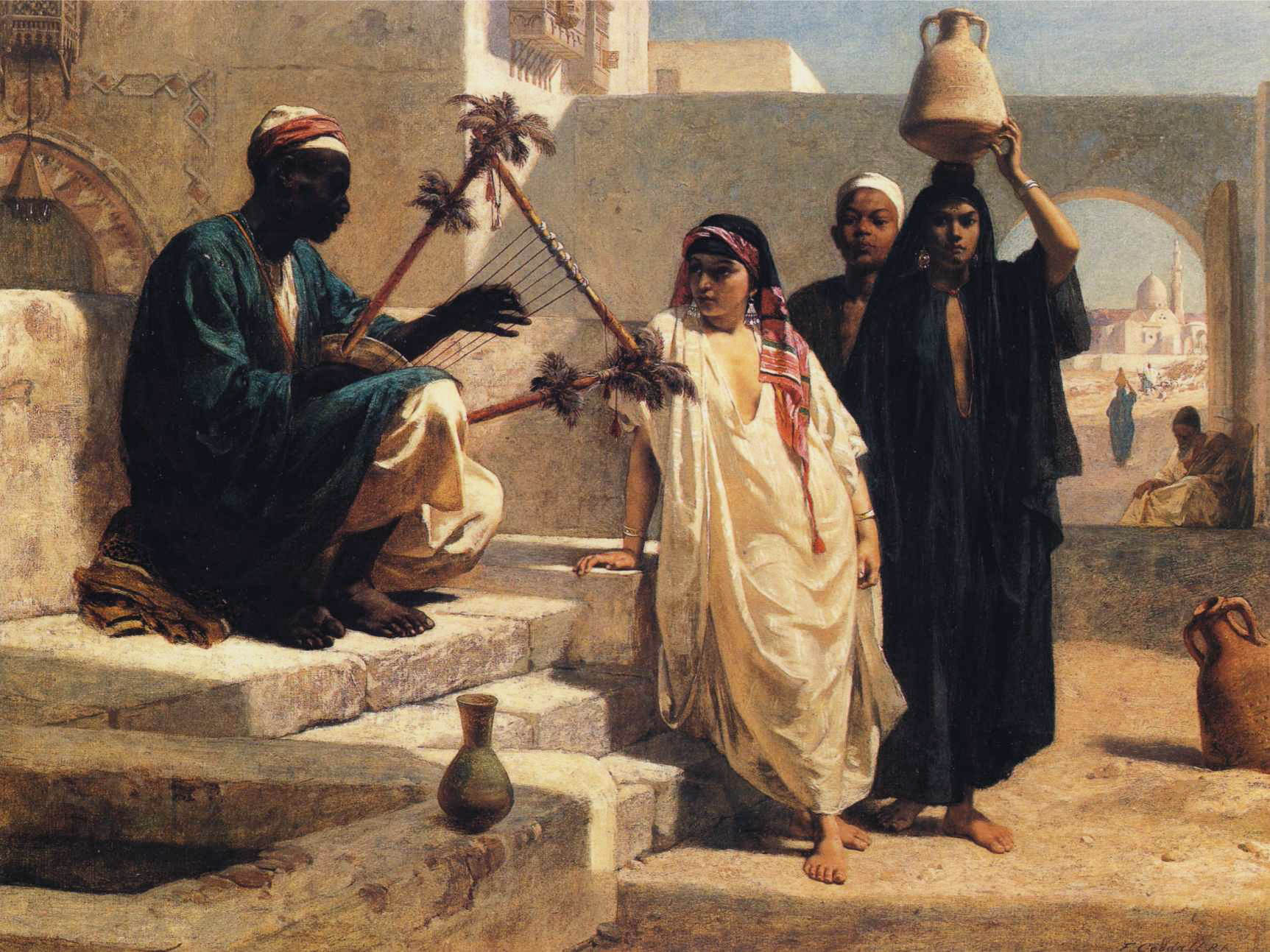
The Song of the Nubian Slave by Frederick Goodall

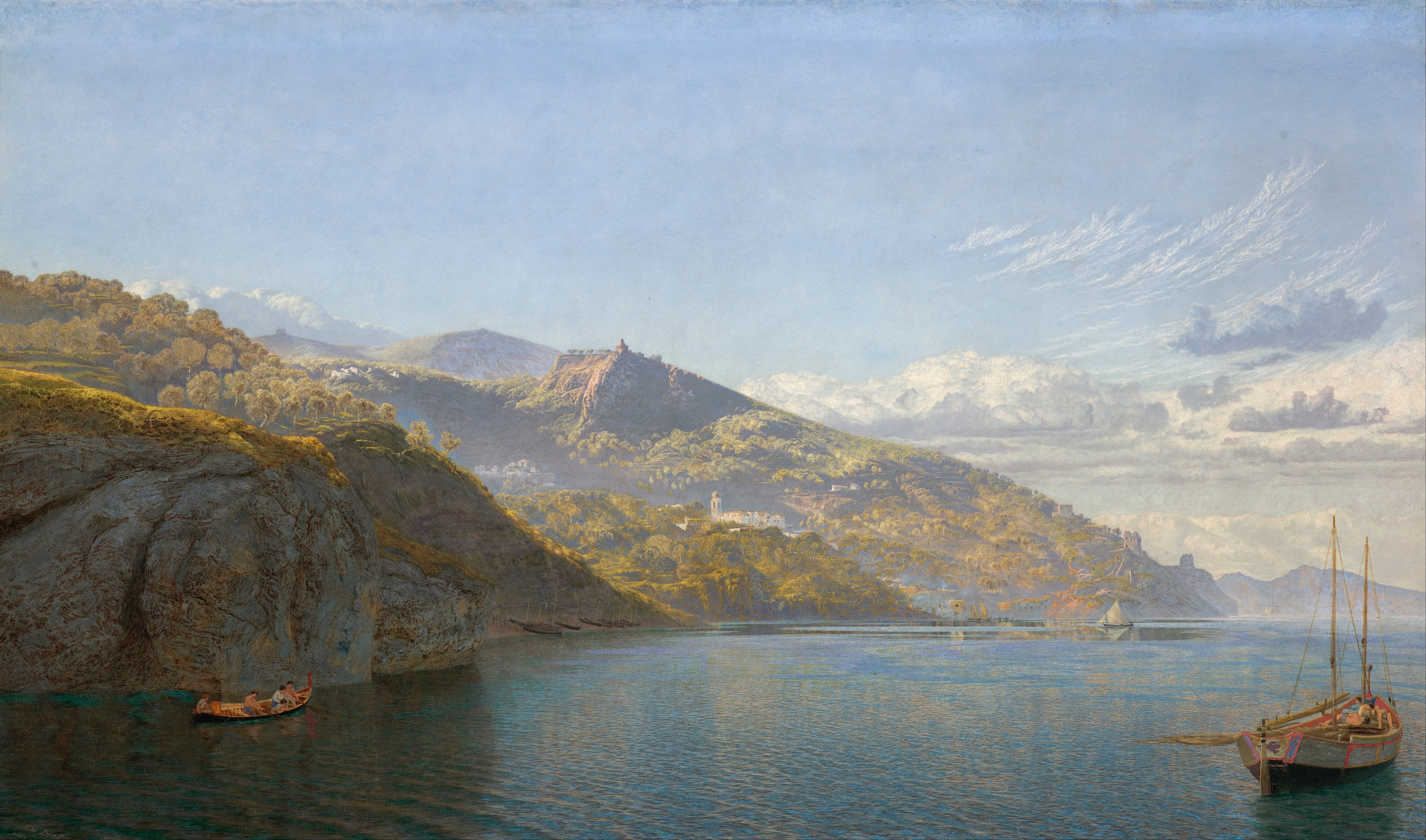
Massa, Bay of Naples by John Brett

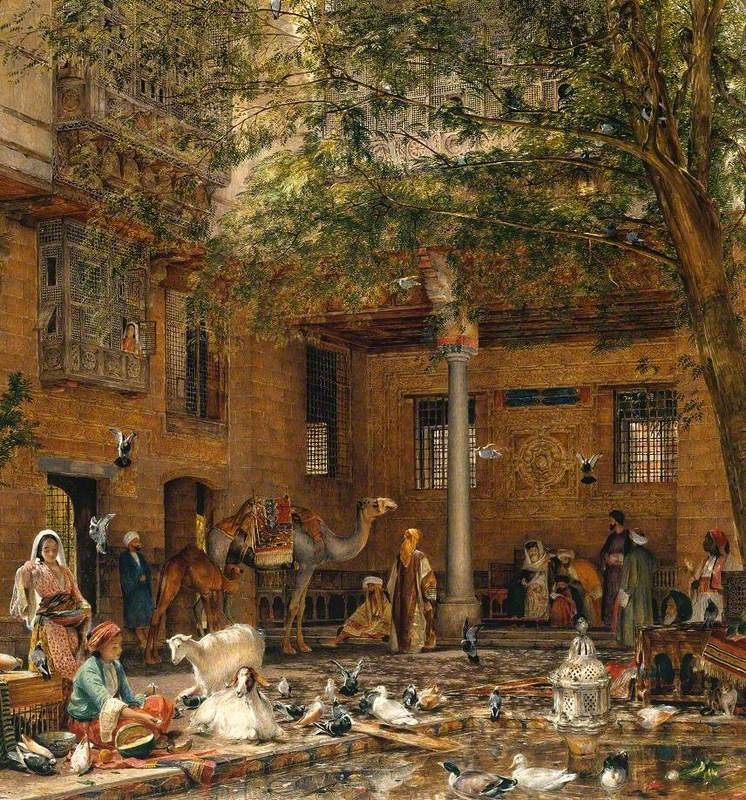
The Courtyard of the Coptic Patriarch's House in Cairo by John Frederick Lewis

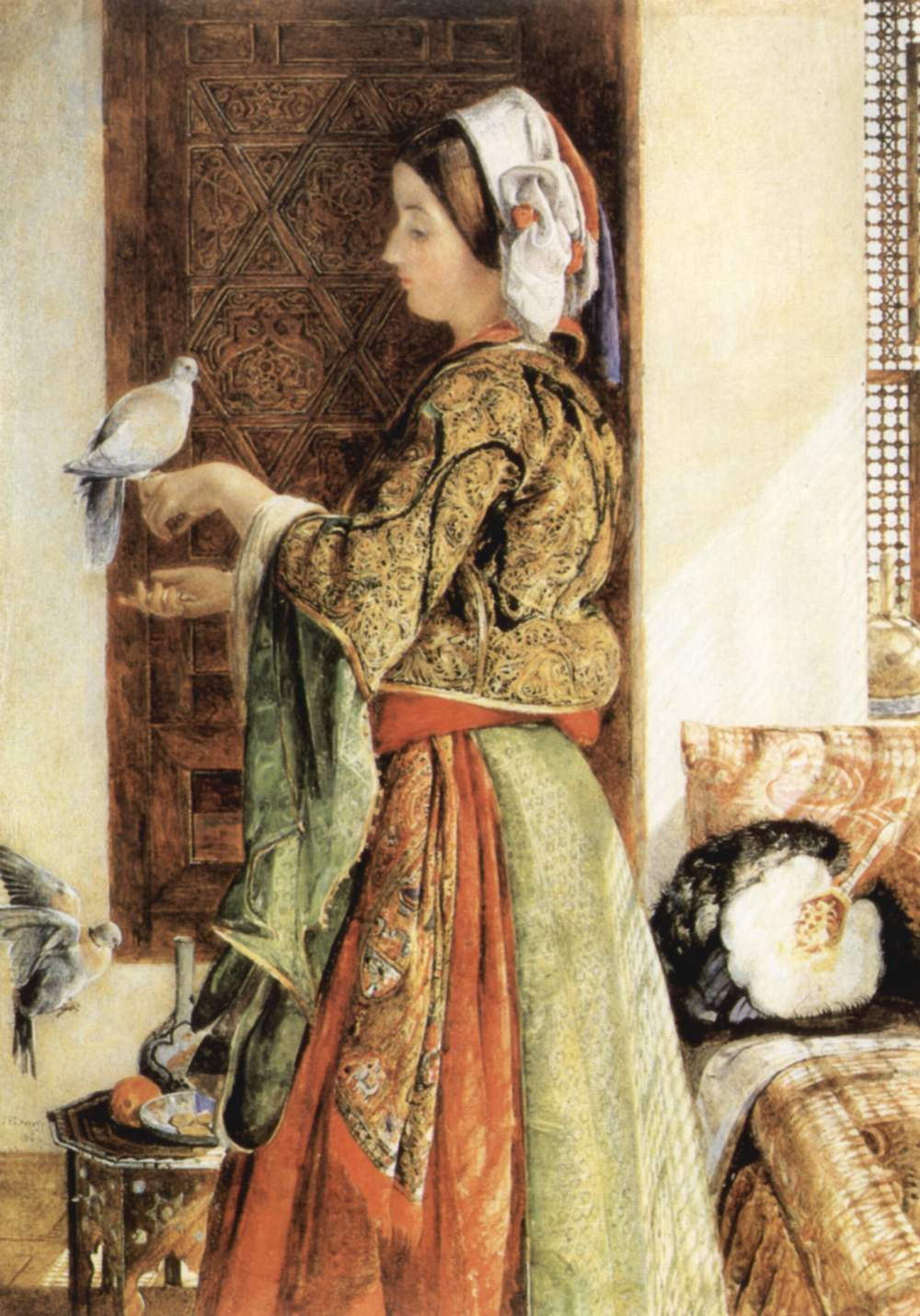
Caged Doves, Cairo by John Frederick Lewis

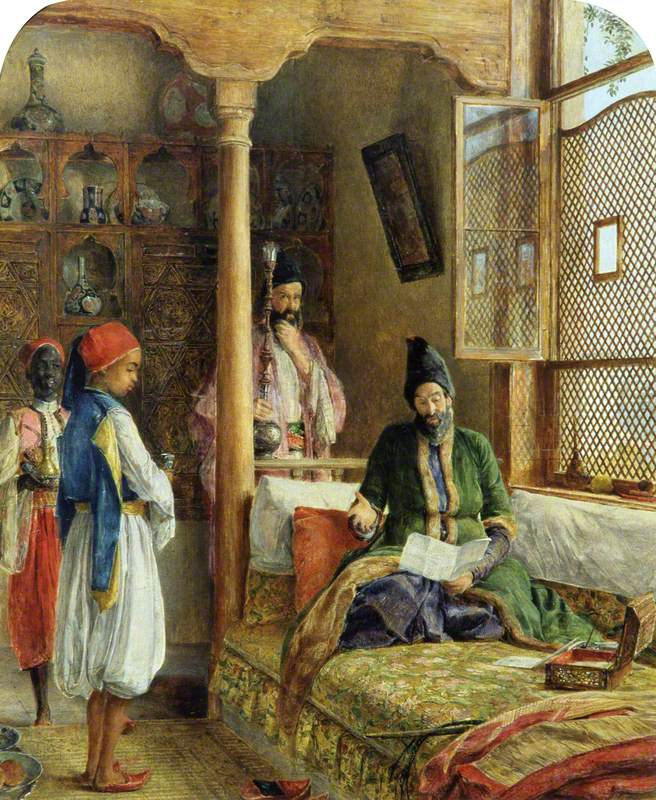
A Startling Account, Constantinople by John Frederick Lewis

Summer Song by Frederick Goodall

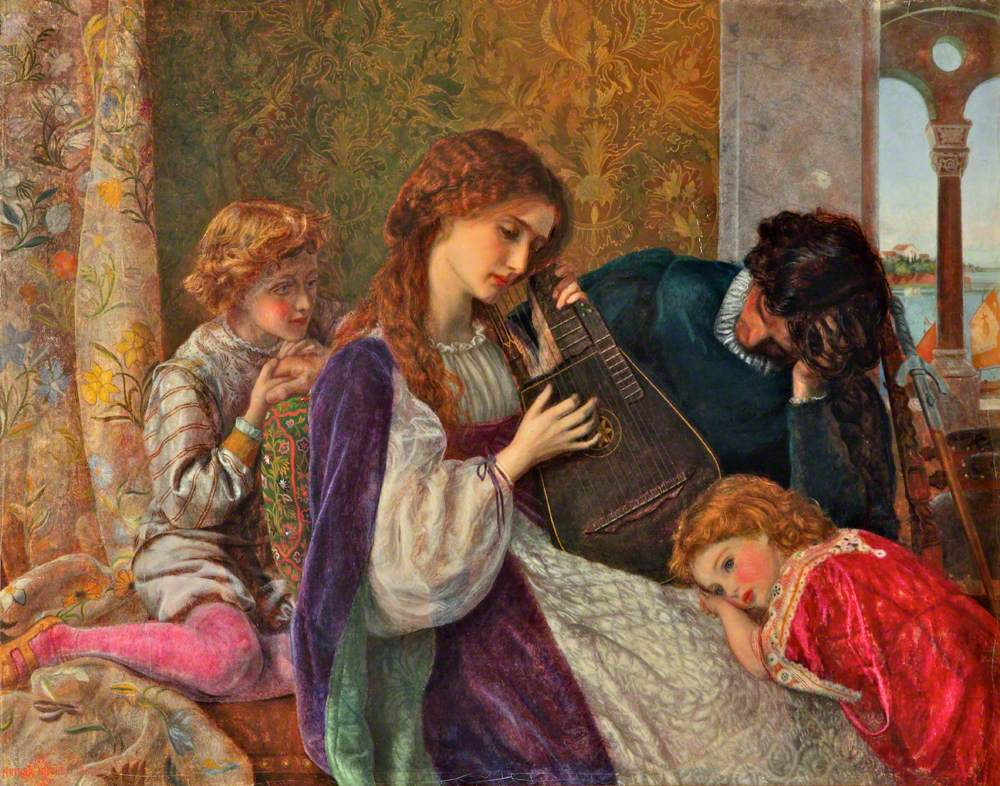
A Music Party by Arthur Hughes

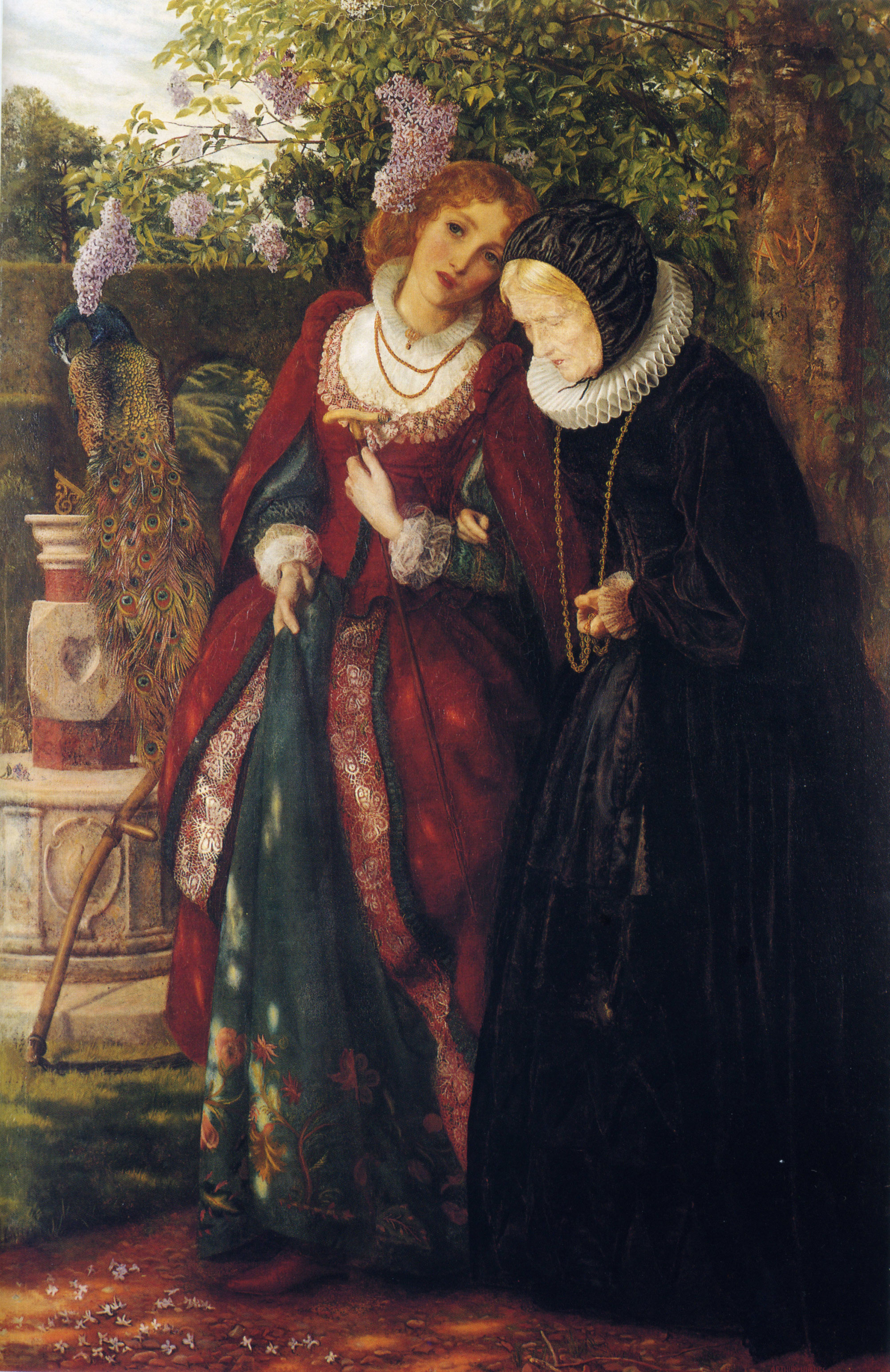
Silver and Gold by Arthur Hughes

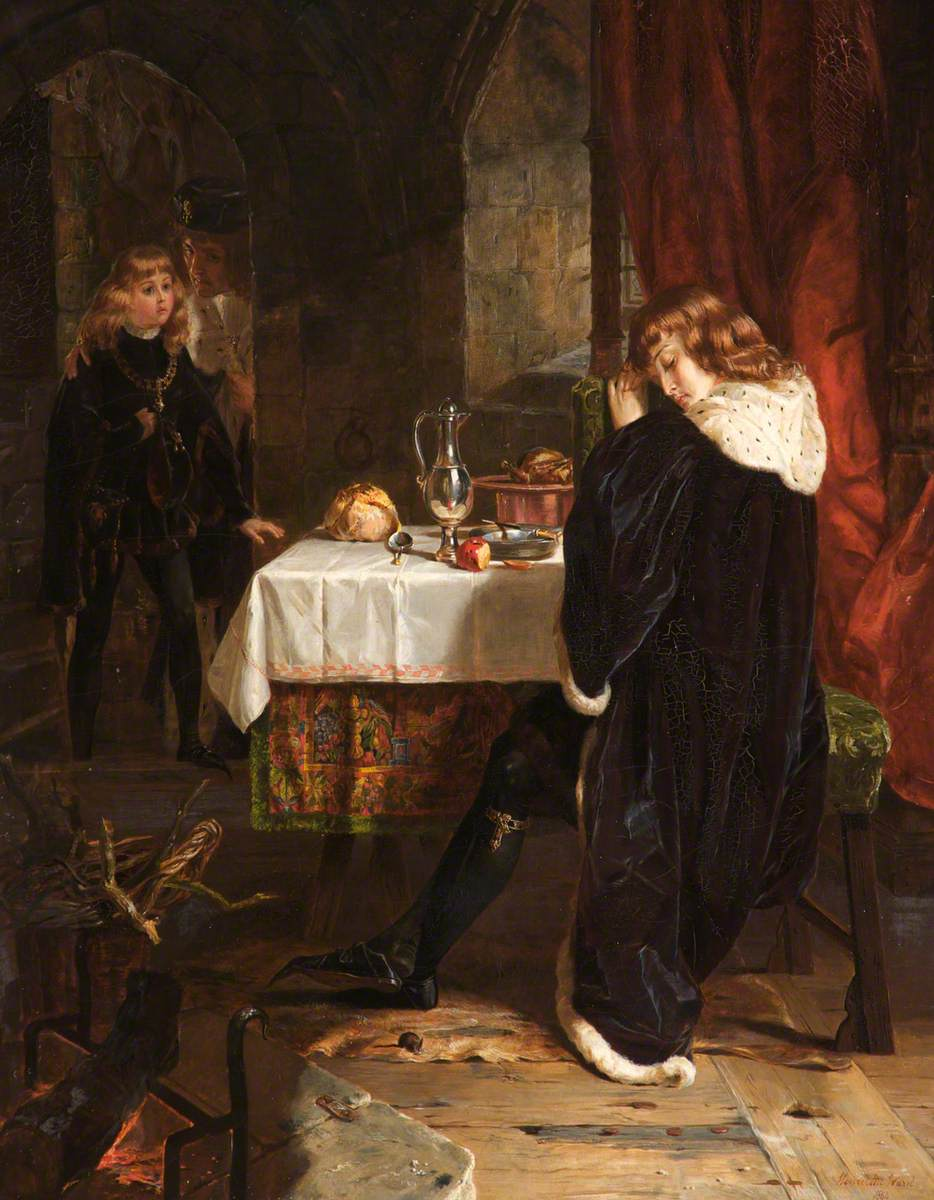
The Princes in the Tower by Henrietta Ward

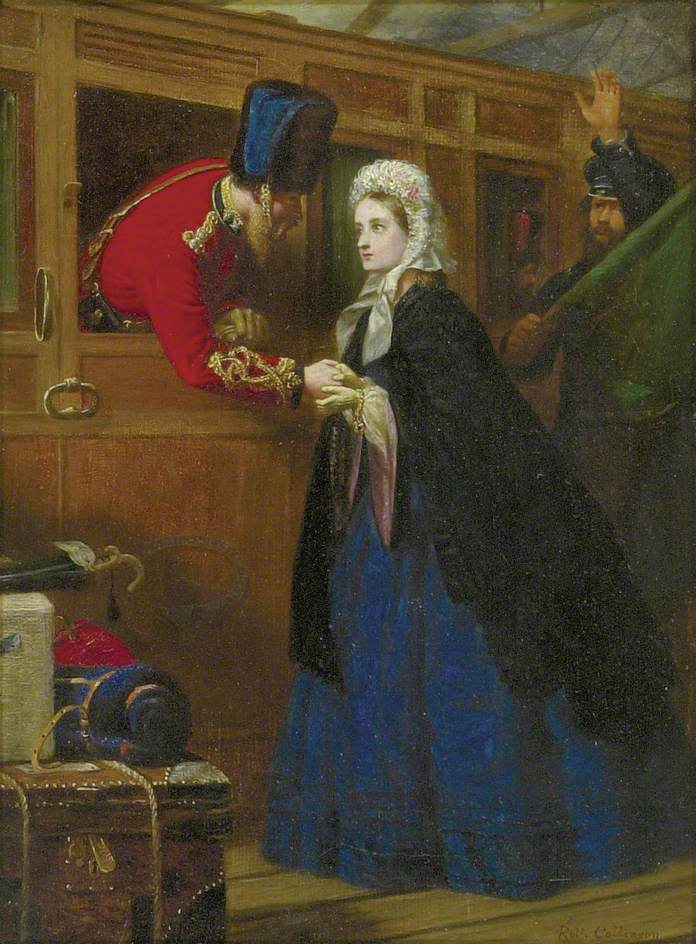
Ordered on Foreign Service by Robert Collinson

George Fox Refusing to Take the Oath at Houlker Hall by John Pettie

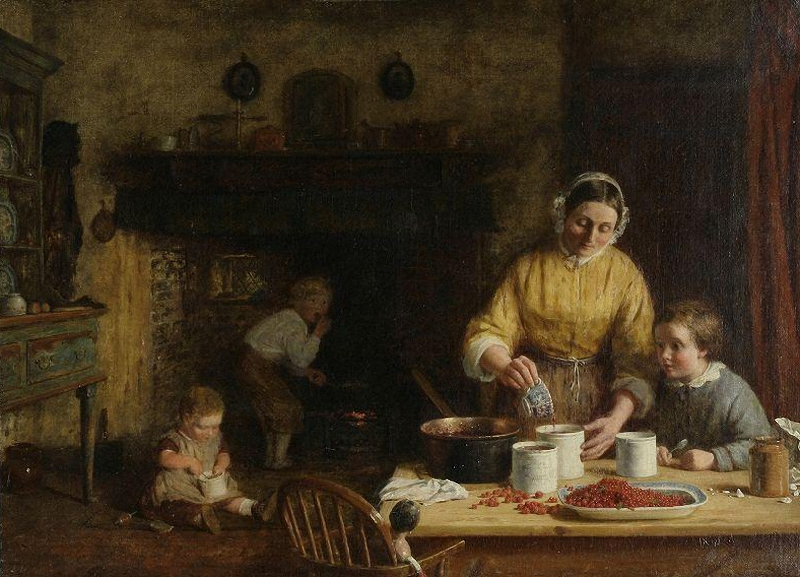
Preserving by Frederick Daniel Hardy

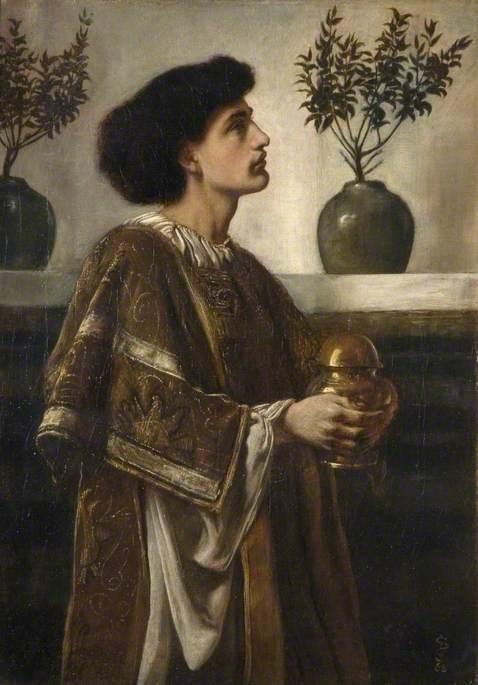
A Deacon by Simeon Solomon

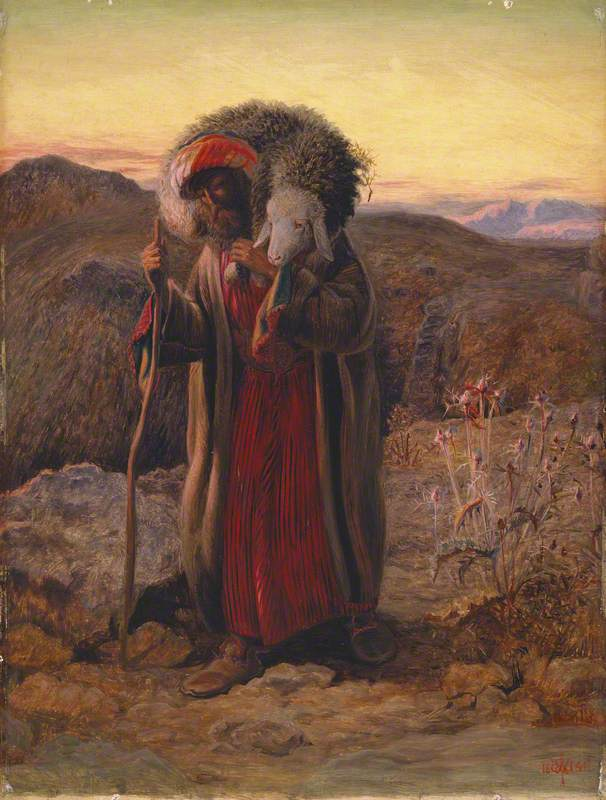
The Lost Sheep by William James Webbe

Jane Shore Doing Penance by Richard Redgrave

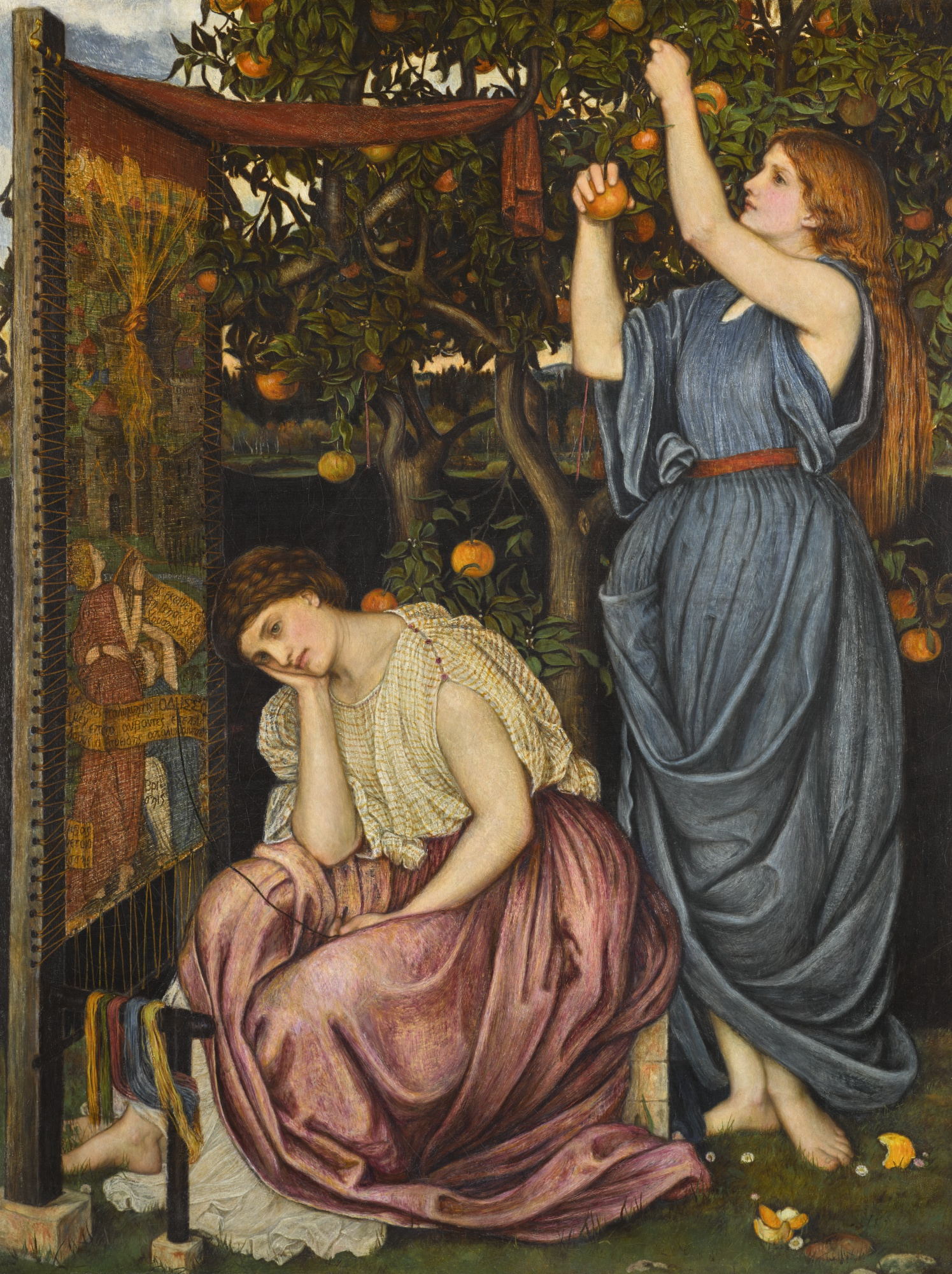
Penelope by John Roddam Spencer Stanhope

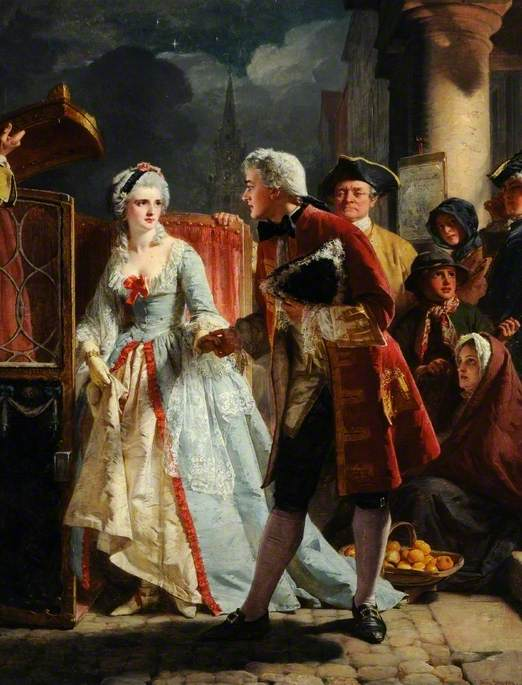
Robin Adair by Alexander Johnston

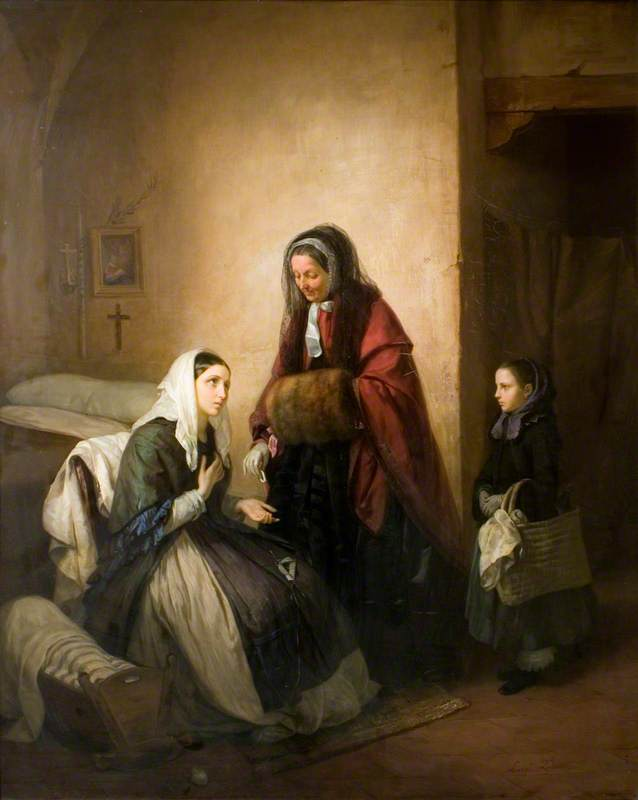
Charity by Luigi Zuccoli

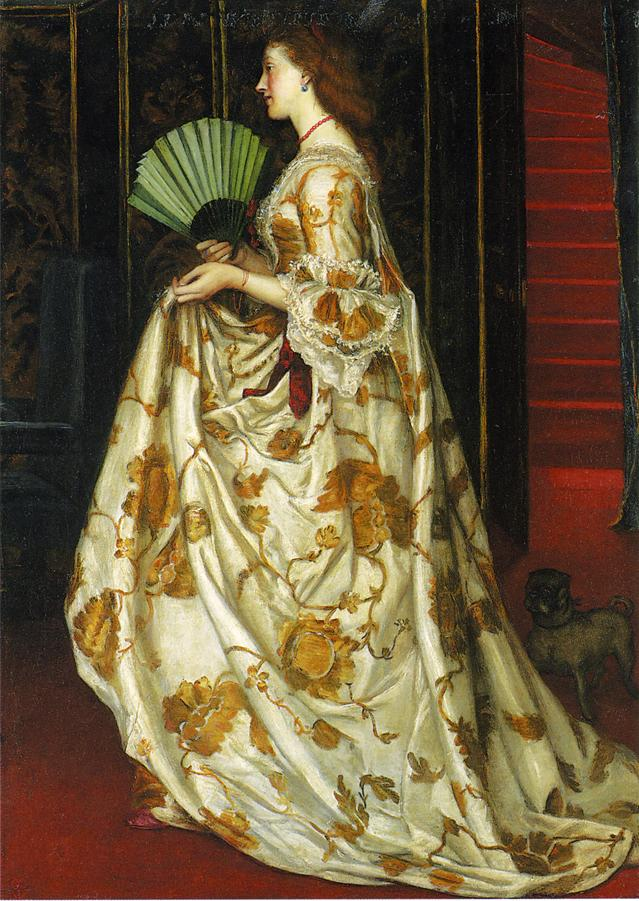
My Lady Betty by Valentine Prinsep

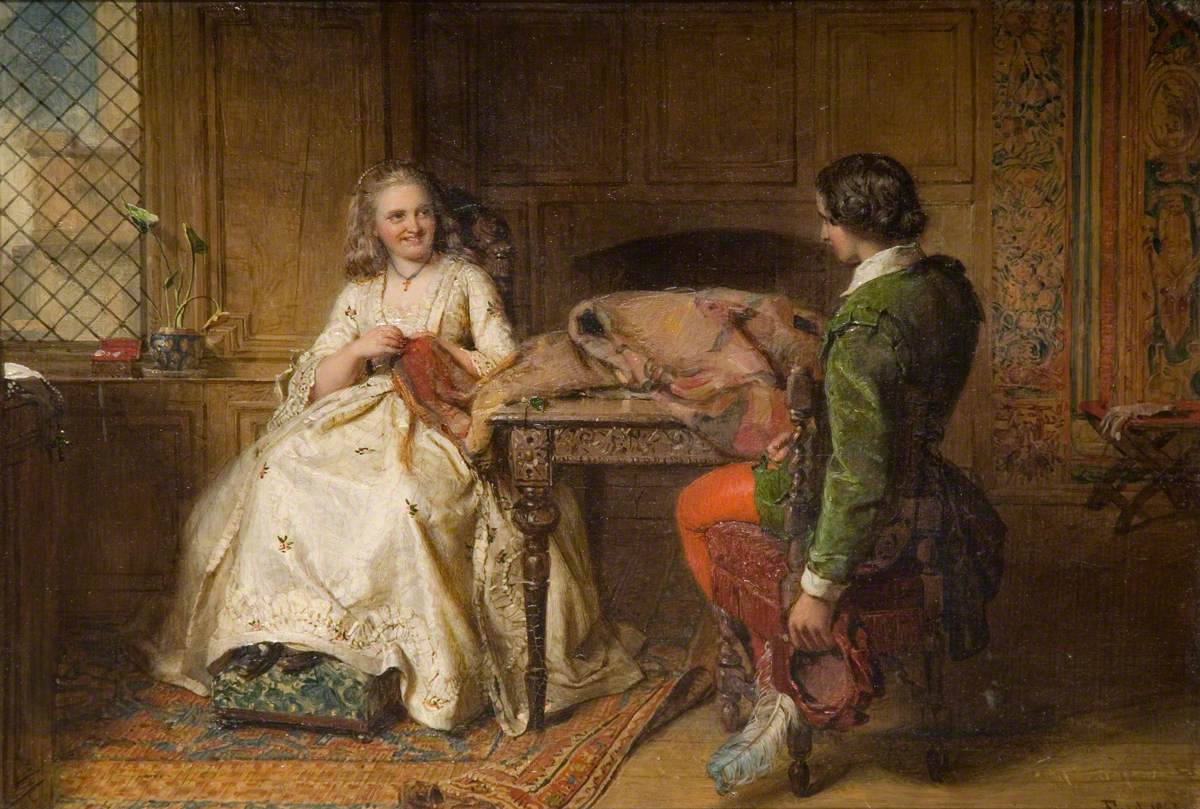
Catherine Seyton by John Faed

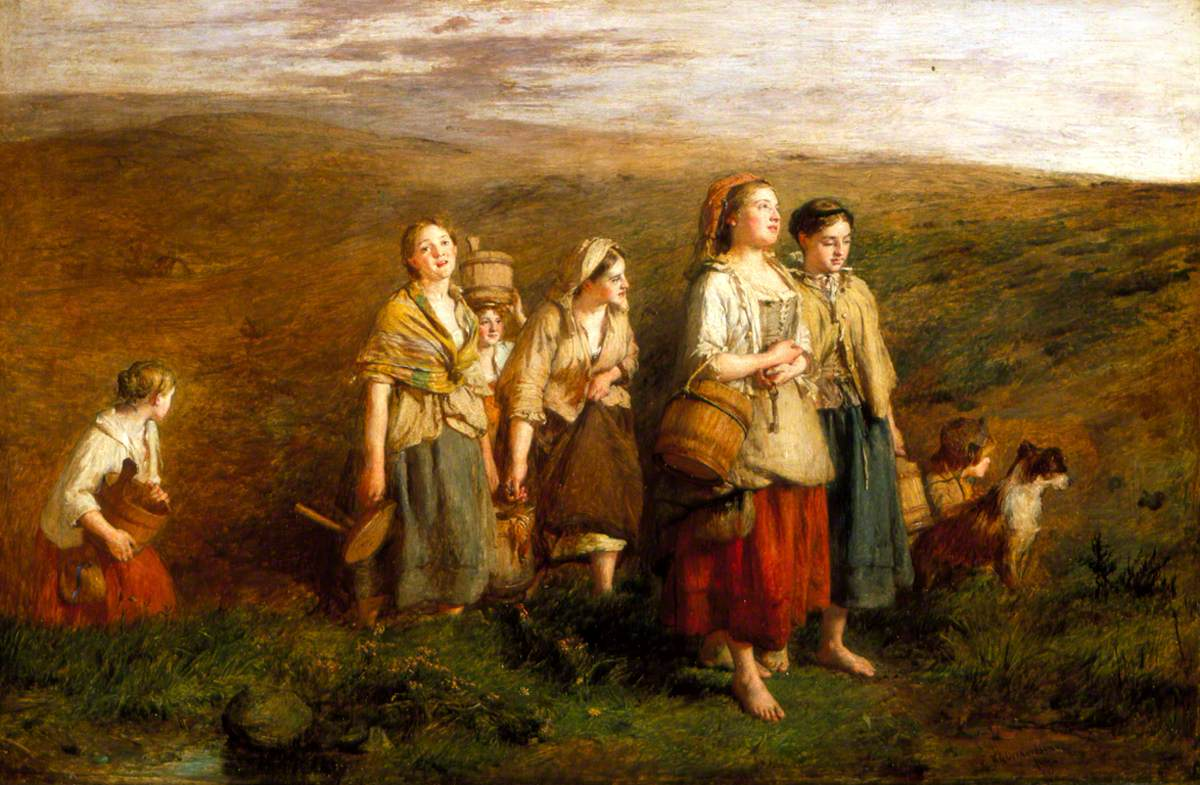
The Flowers of the Forest by William Quiller Orchardson

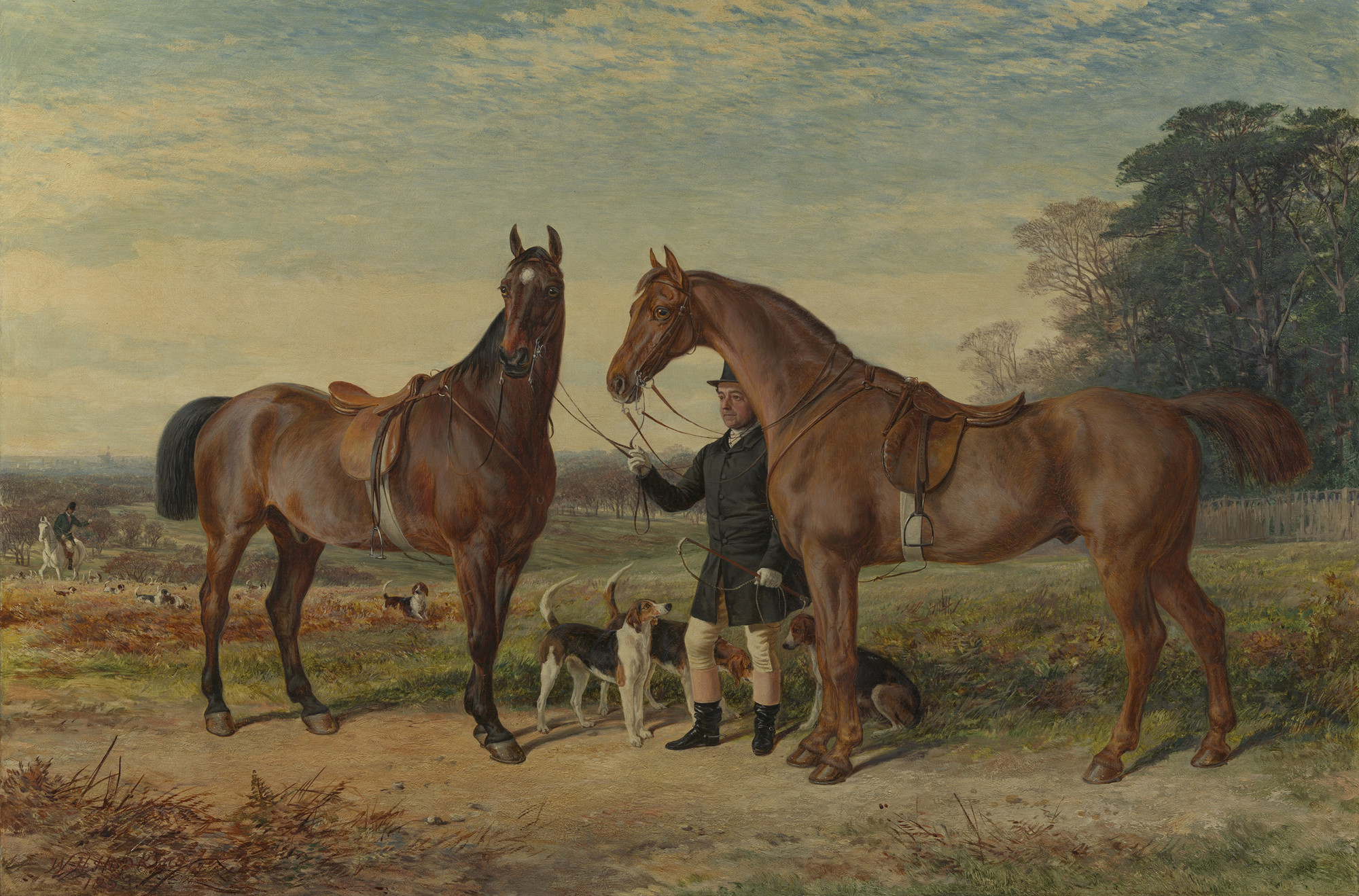
Thomas Portman with Guy Mannering and Ghillie Callum by William Henry Hopkins

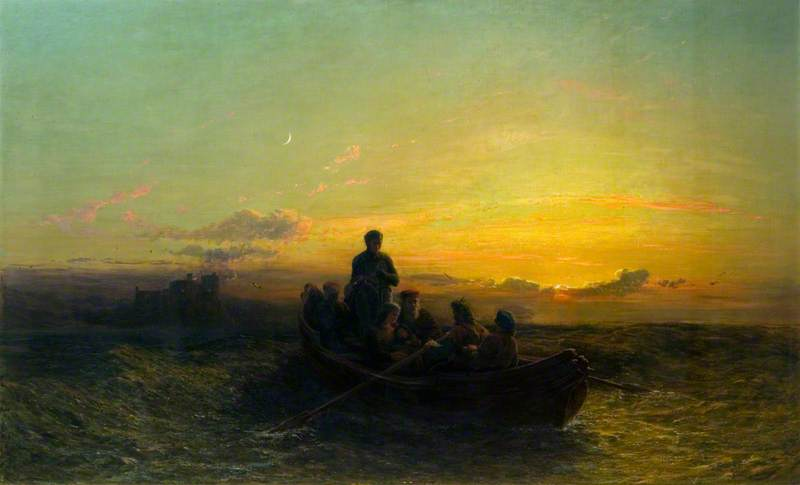
The Escape of Mary, Queen of Scots by Thomas Danby

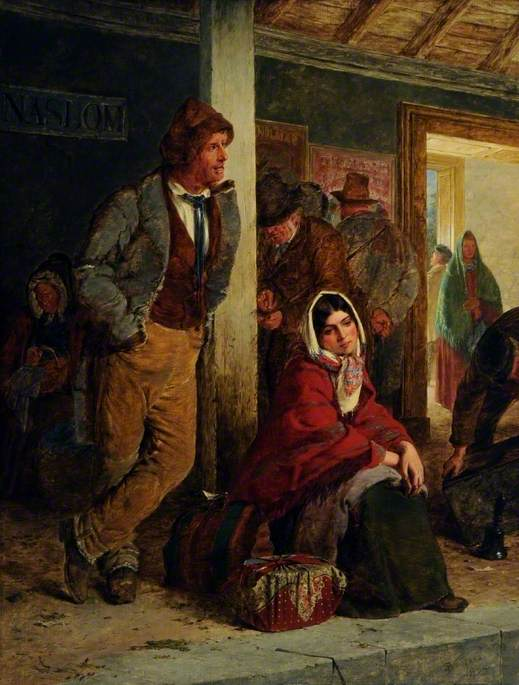
Waiting for the Train by Erskine Nicol

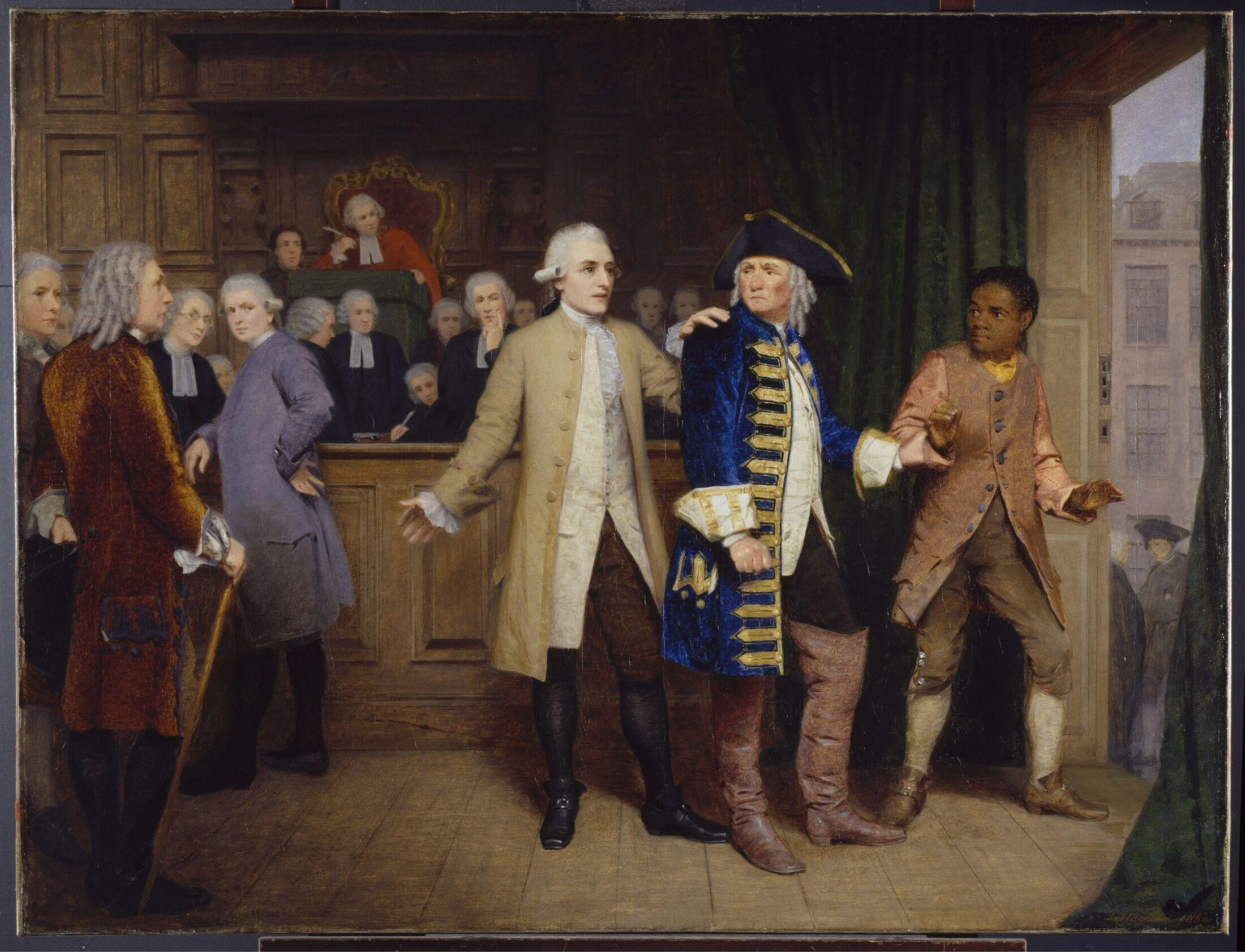
Granville Sharp the Abolitionist Rescuing a Slave from the Hands of His Master by James Hayllar

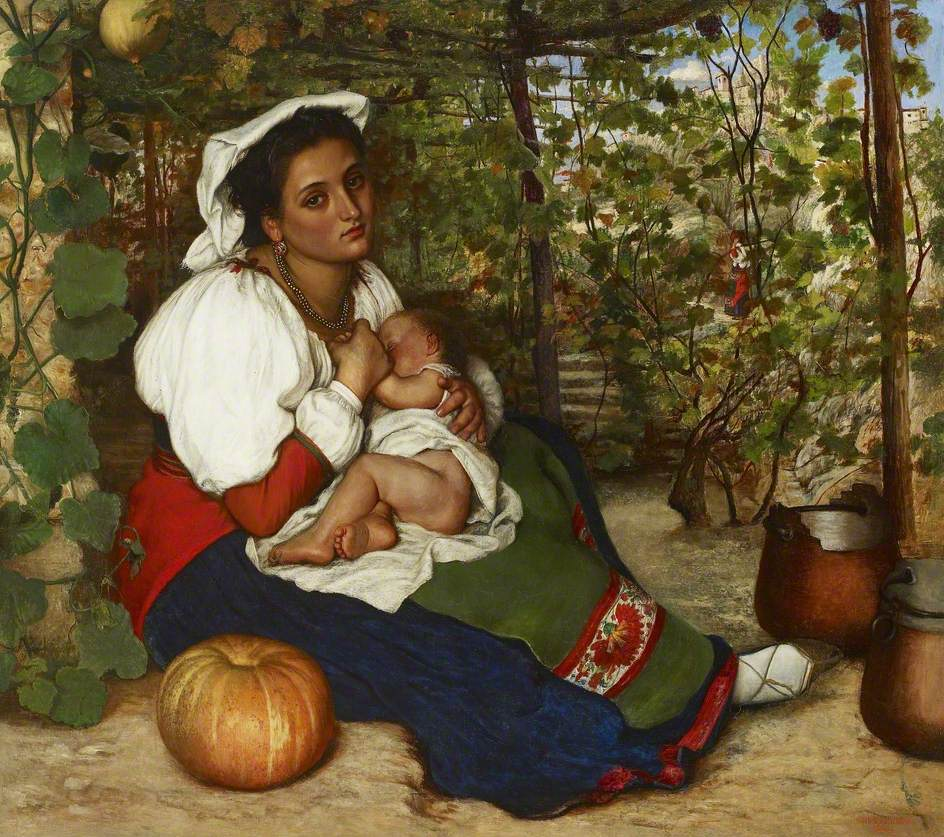
A Woman of San German by Robert Braithwaite Martineau

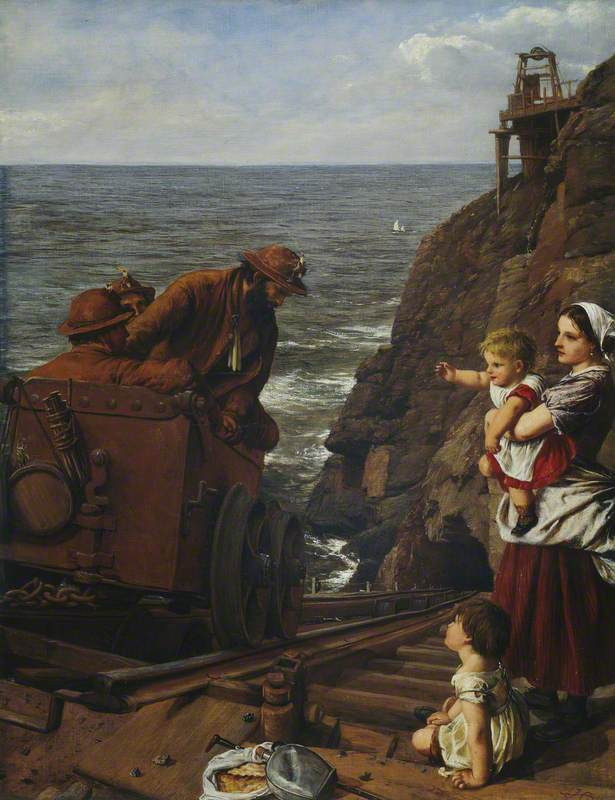
From Under the Sea by James Clarke Hook

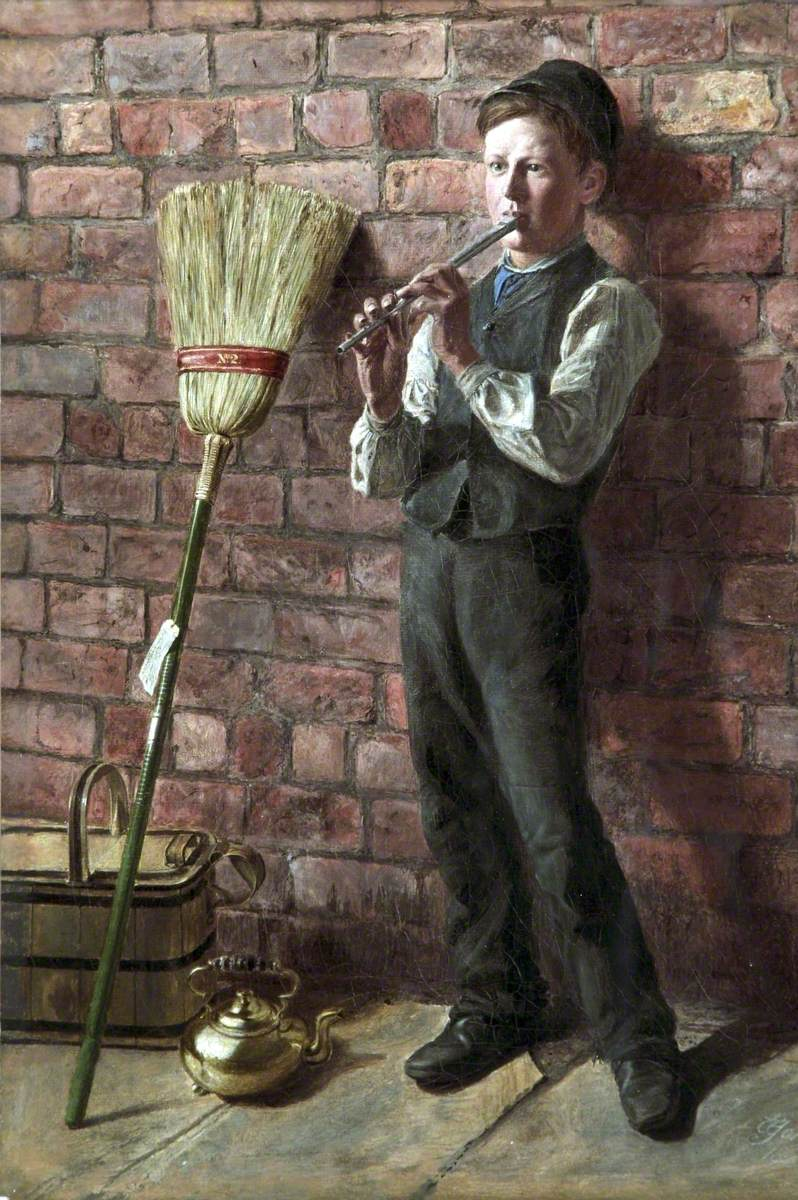
Music Versus Work by Joseph Edward Worrall

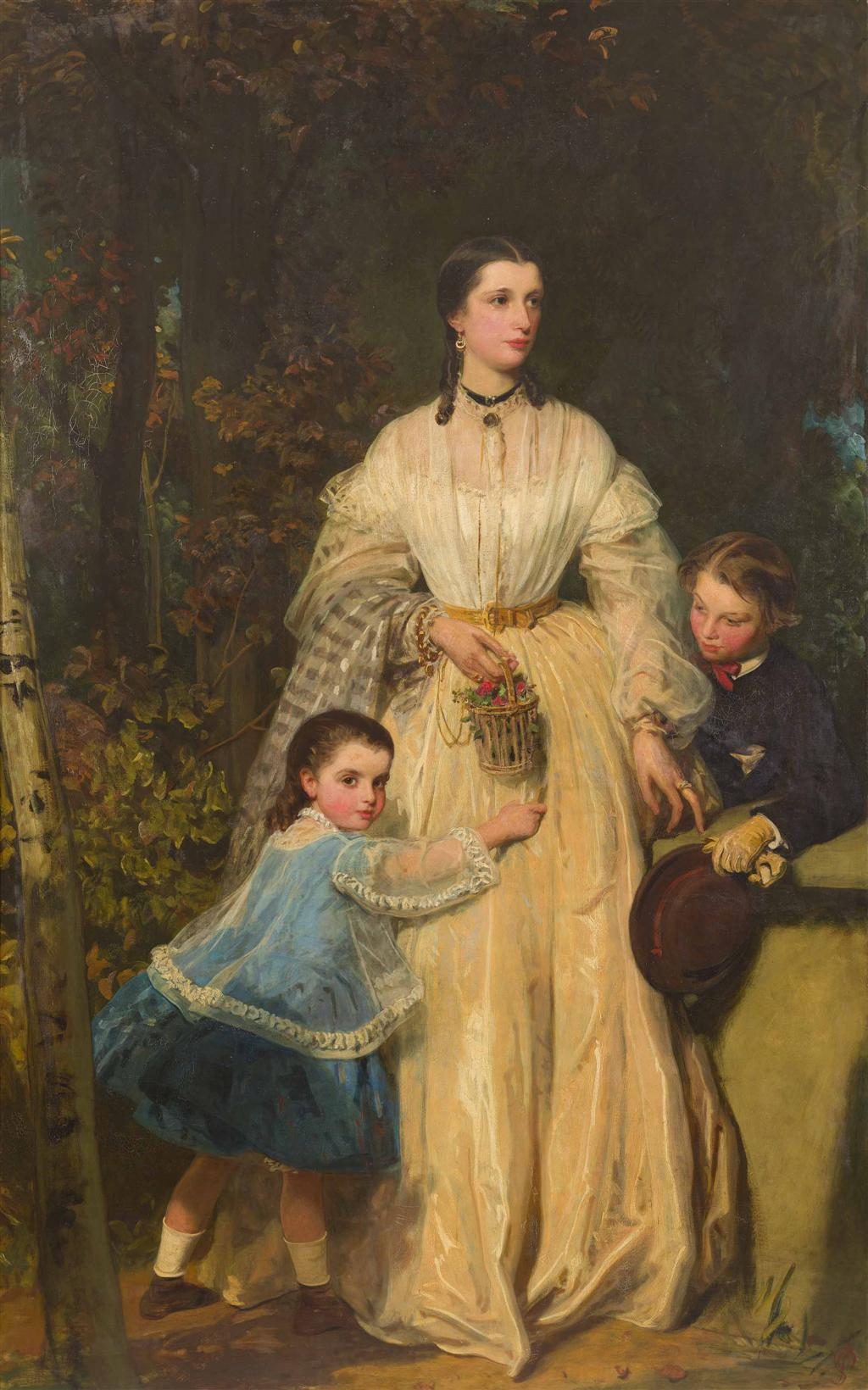
Mary Fothergill and her Children by James Sant

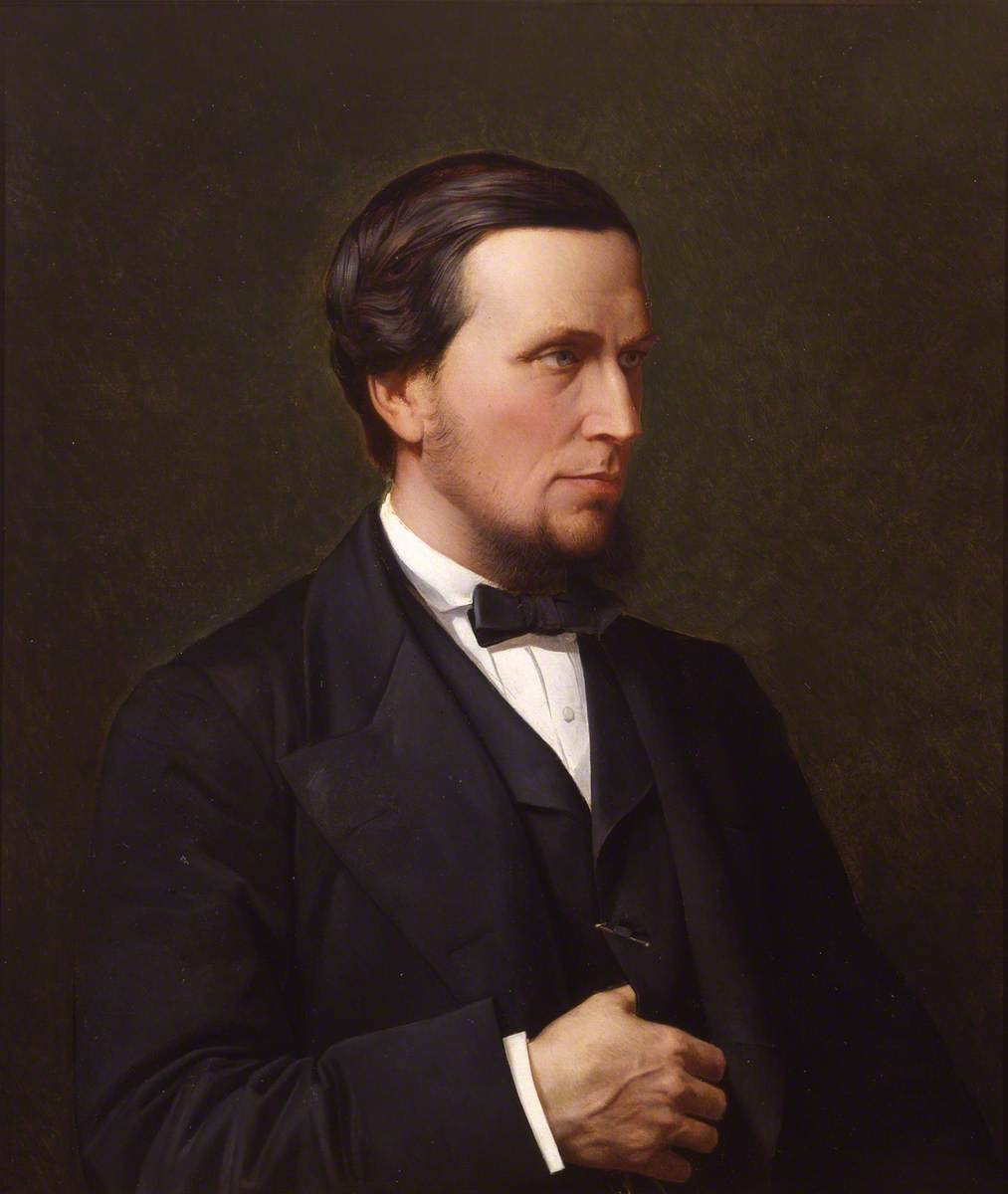
William Brinton by Edward Armitage

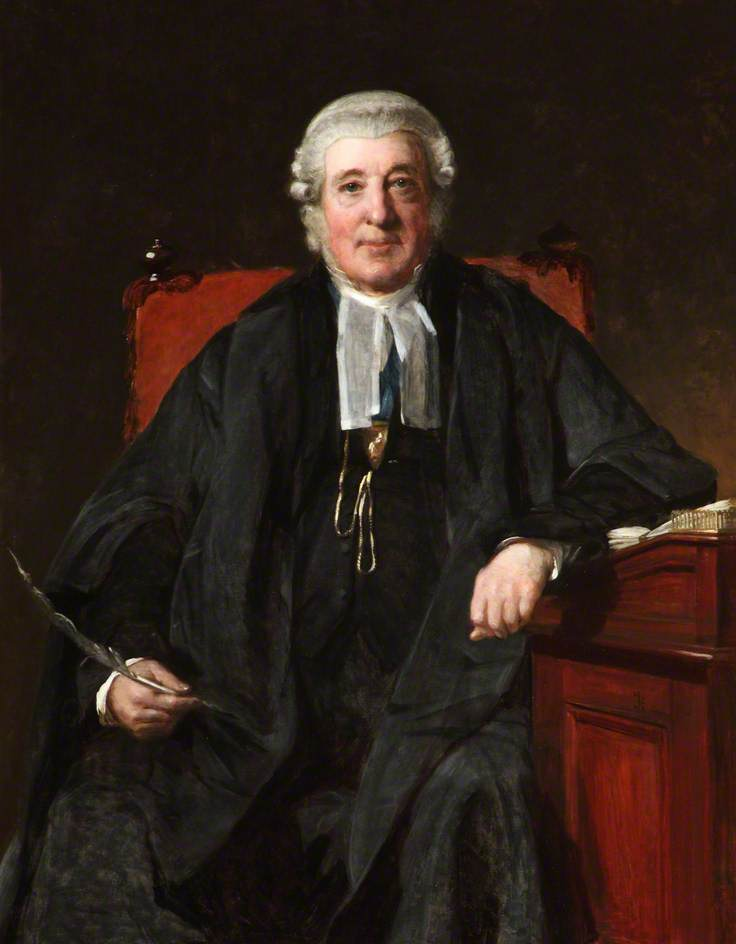
William Bodkin by John Prescott Knight

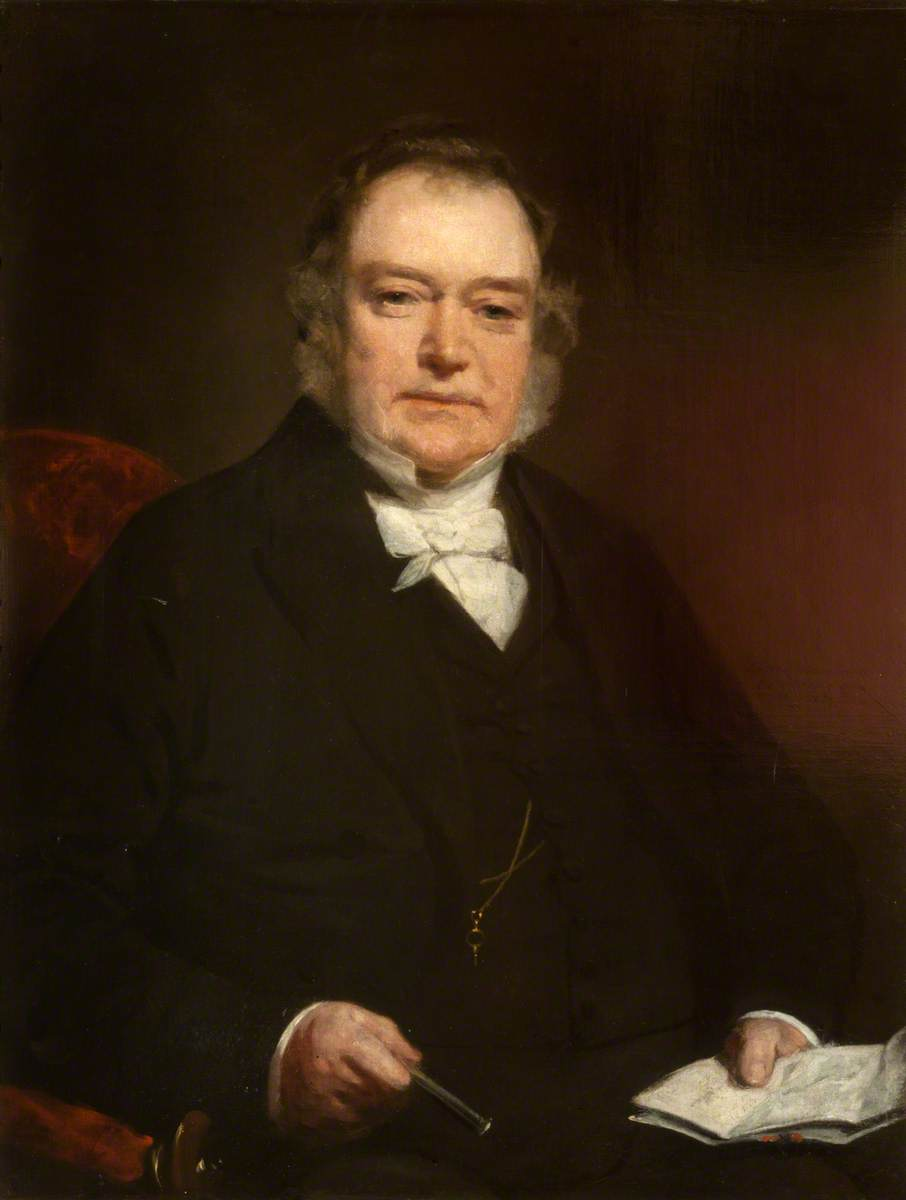
William Seller by John Watson Gordon

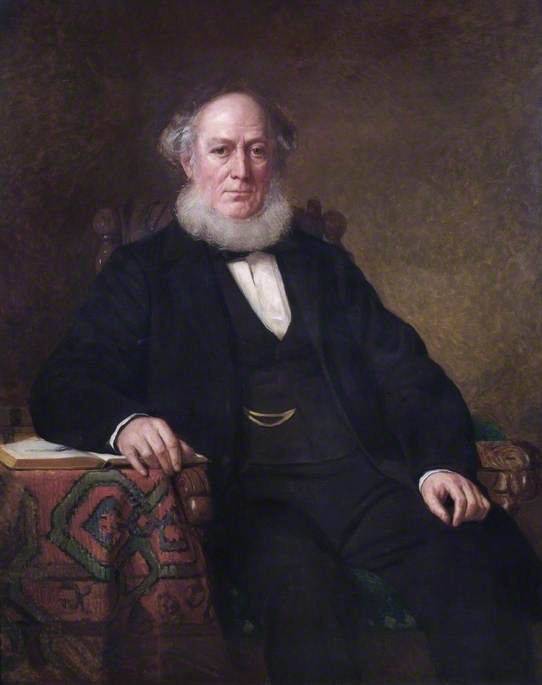
Matthew Marshall by Thomas Mackinlay

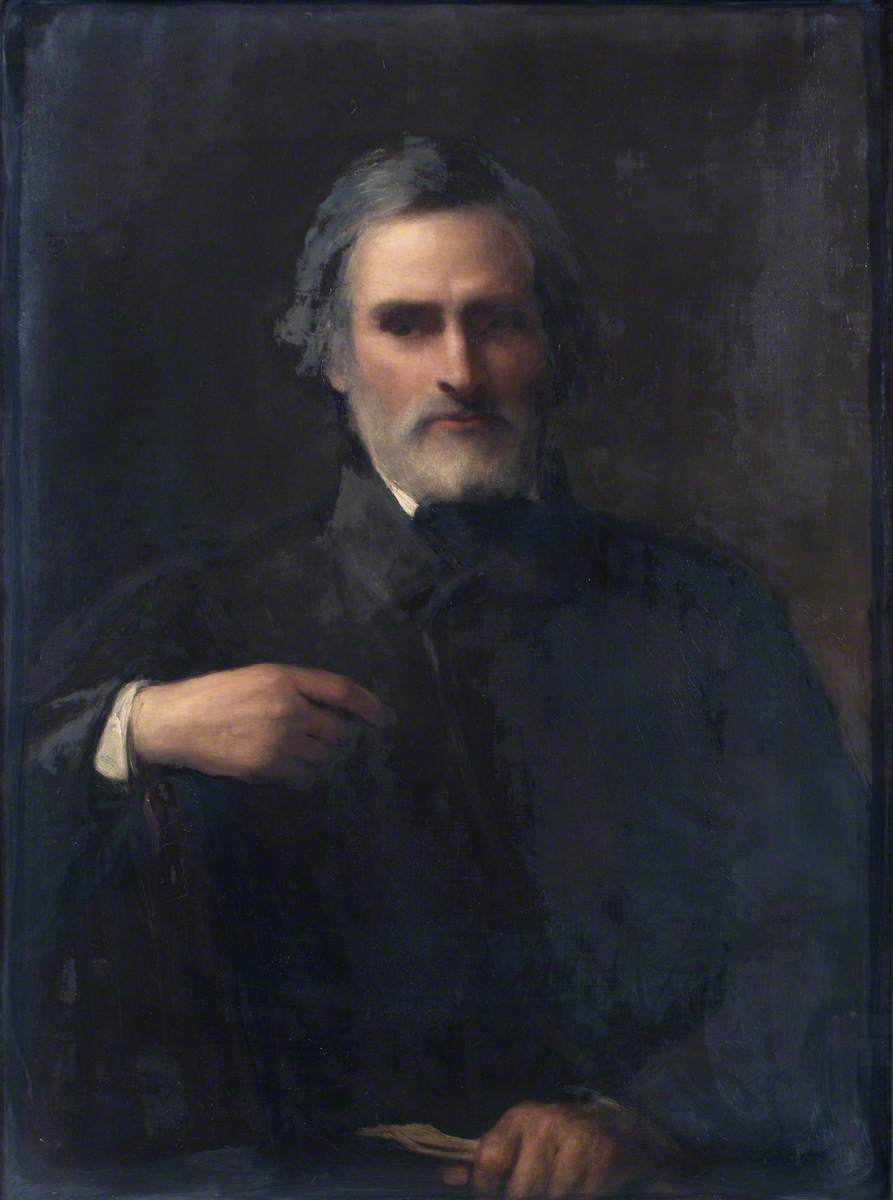
John Gibson by William Boxall

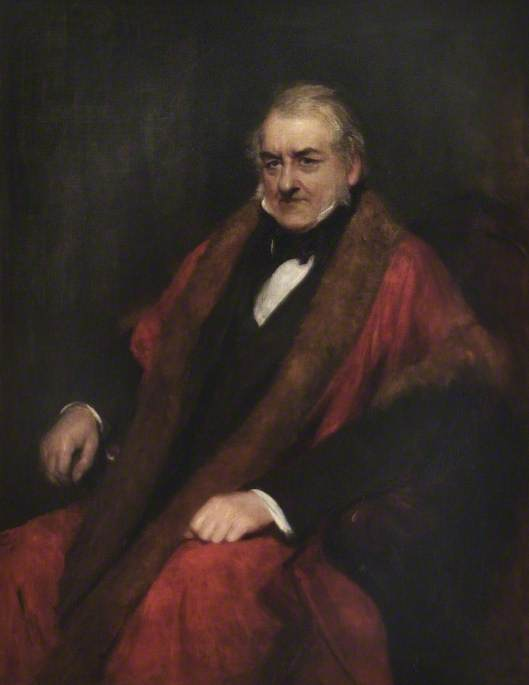
Charles James Sadler by William Boxall

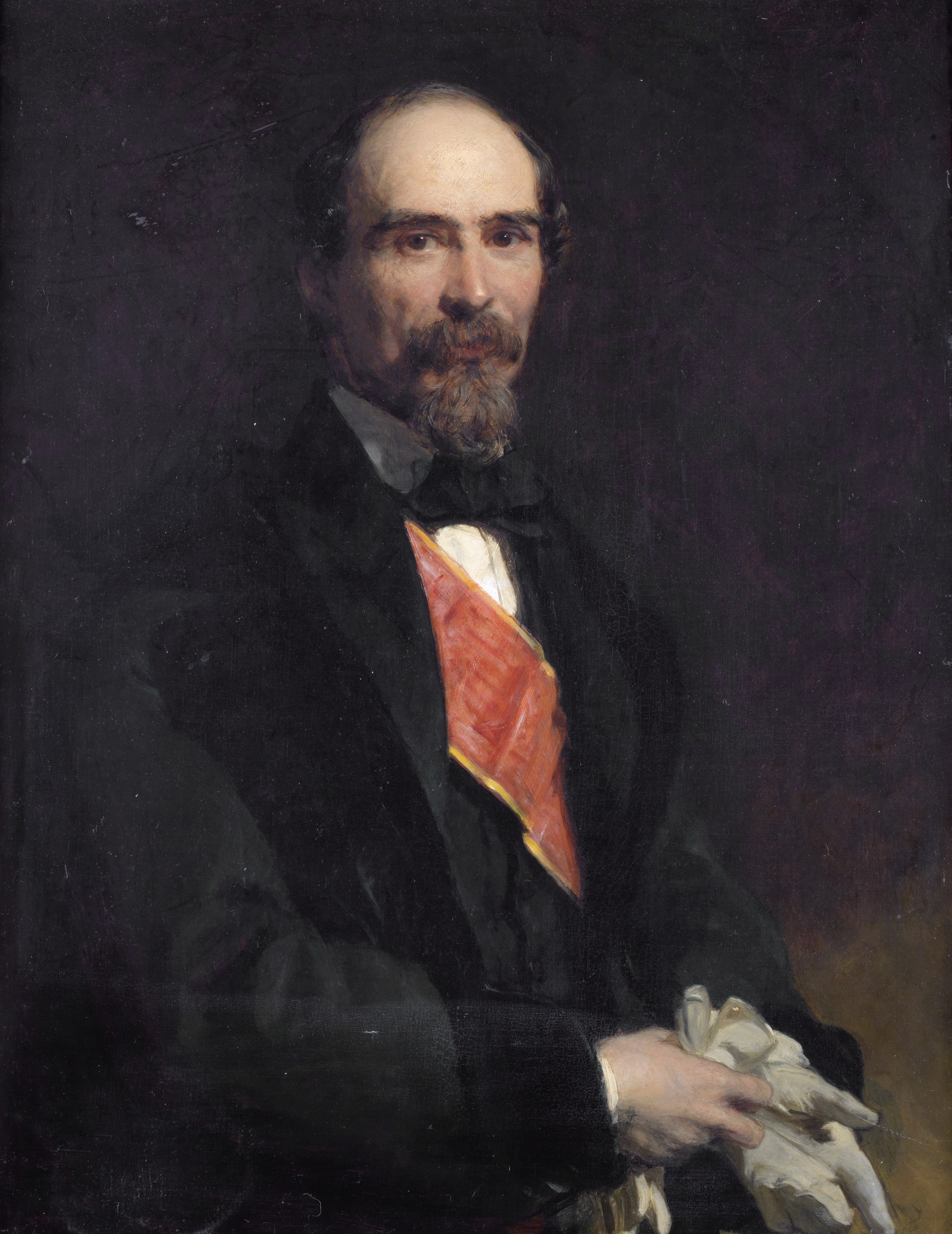
Ramon Cabrera by John Prescott Knight

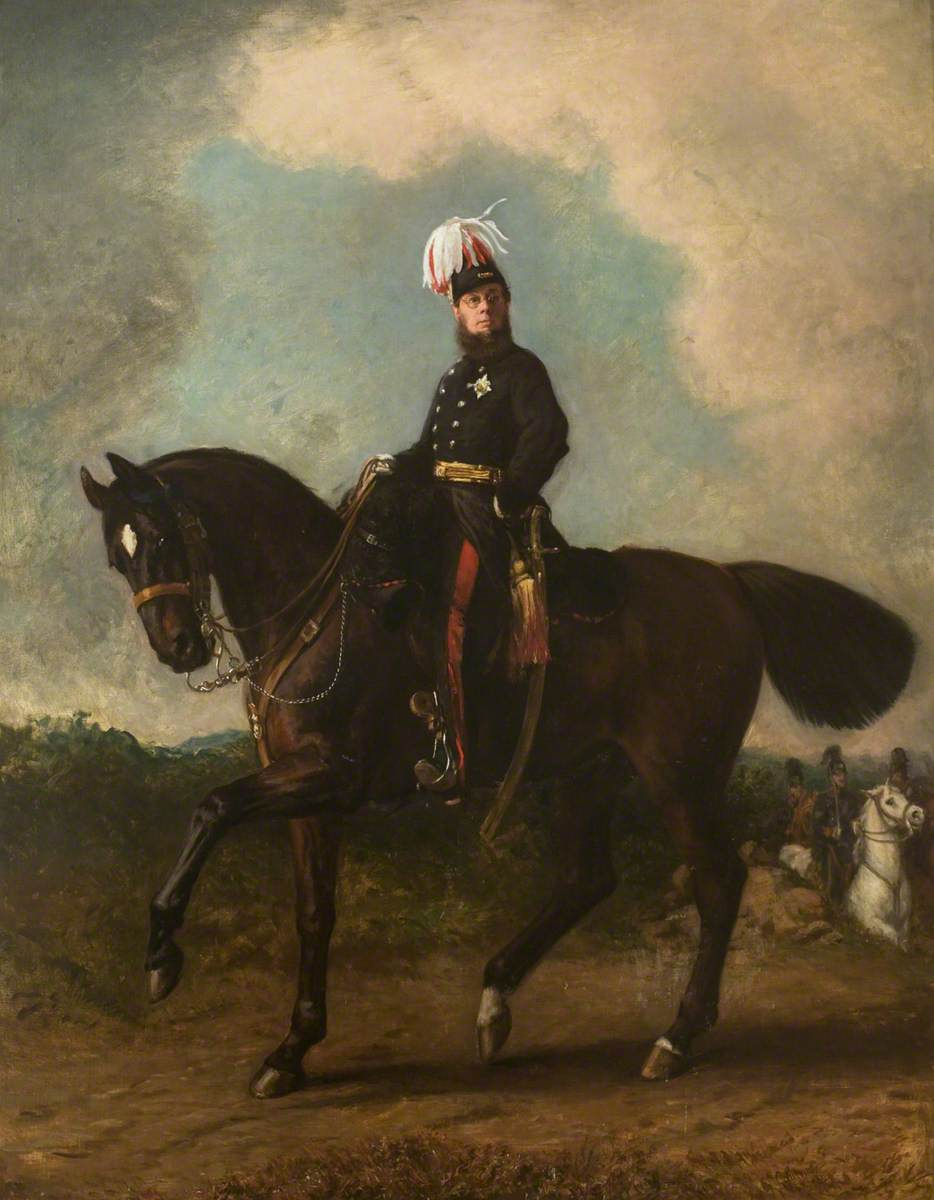
Marquess of Ailsa by Charles Lutyens

Portrait of Lilly Noble by John Everett Millais

== See also ==
- Salon of 1864, contemporary art exhibition held in Paris

== Bibliography ==
- Ormond, Richard. Sir Edwin Landseer. Philadelphia Museum of Art, 1981.
- Riding, Christine. John Everett Millais. Harry N. Abrams, 2006.
