= Scheveningen Pincks off the Coast of Yarmouth =

Painting by Edward William Cooke

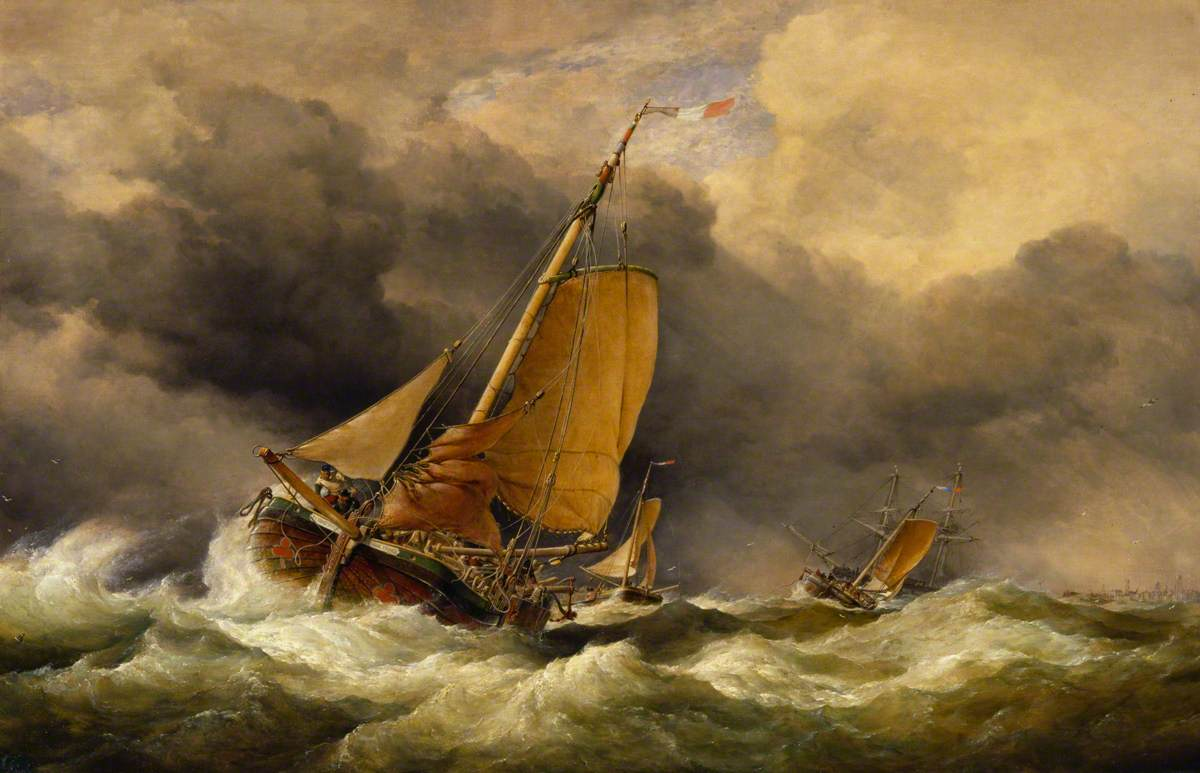
- Artist: Edward William Cooke
- Year: 1864
- Type: Oil on canvas, maritime painting
- Dimensions: 90.2 cm × 137.2 cm (35.5 in × 54.0 in)
- Location: Royal Academy of Arts, London

Scheveningen Pincks off the Coast of Yarmouth is an oil painting by the English artist Edward William Cooke, from 1864.

== Description ==
A seascape, it depicts Dutch fishing boats (known as pincks) blown away from their home port of Scheveningen by fierce easterly gales and compelled to seek shelter by heading for Great Yarmouth on the coast of Norfolk. Cooke was a protégé of Clarkson Frederick Stanfield, an established painter of maritime scenes. Cooke was known for frequently featuring Dutch scenes in his output. It was displayed at the Royal Academy Exhibition of 1864 at the National Gallery. When he was elected to membership of the Royal Academy of Arts, Cooke presented this as his diploma work.

== Bibliography ==
- Chapel, Jeannie. Victorian Taste: The Complete Catalogue of Paintings at the Royal Holloway College. Zwemmer, 1982.
- Cordingly, David. Painters of the Sea: A Survey of Dutch and English Marine Paintings from British Collections. Lund Humphries, 1979.
- Van der Merwe, Pieter & Took, Roger. The Spectacular Career of Clarkson Stanfield. Tyne and Wear County Council Museums, 1979.
