= From Under the Sea =

Painting by James Clarke Hook

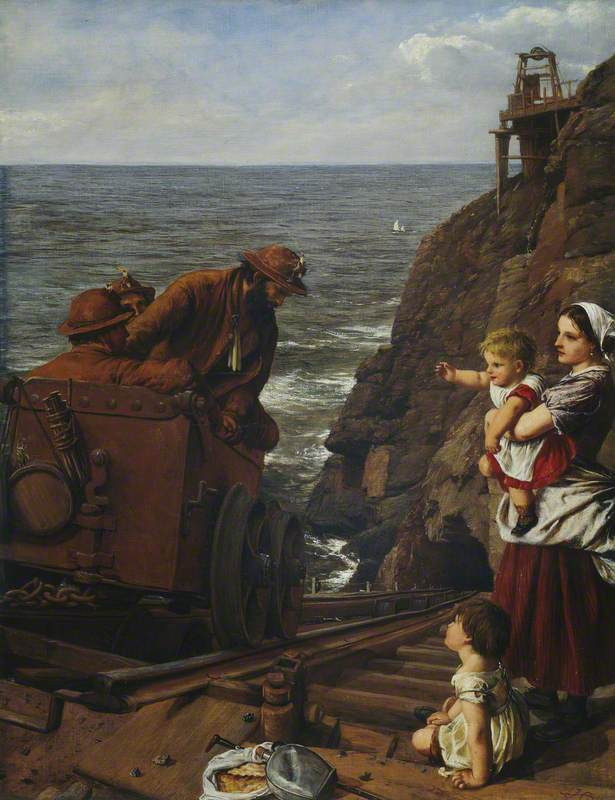
- Artist: James Clarke Hook
- Year: 1864
- Type: Oil on canvas, genre painting
- Dimensions: 108.2 cm × 82.6 cm (42.6 in × 32.5 in)
- Location: Manchester Art Gallery, Greater Manchester

From Under the Sea is an oil painting on canvas by the British artist James Clarke Hook, from 1864.

It depicts a scene at the Botallack Mine near St Just in Penwith in the west of Cornwall. It shows one of the miners being brought his midday meal by his wife and children. The painting celebrates family life and the dignity of work. It was partly inspired by the accident at the same mine the previous year where ten died. The choice of a vertical painting, unusual for Hook, allows himself to emphasise the steepness of the way down to the cavern in the cliffs.

Hook was noted for his scenes of life on the English coast. The painting was displayed at the Royal Academy Exhibition of 1864 held at the National Gallery in London. Today the work is in the collection of the Manchester Art Gallery, which acquired it in 1891.

== Bibliography ==
- Cowling, Mary. Victorian Figurative Painting: Domestic Life and the Contemporary Social Scene. Andreas Papadakis, 2000.
- McMaster, Juliet. James Clarke Hook: Painter of the Sea. McGill-Queen's University Press, 2023.
