= Charlie Is My Darling (painting) =

Painting by John Everett Millais

- Artist: John Everett Millais
- Year: 1864
- Type: Oil on canvas, genre painting
- Dimensions: 109 cm × 68.5 cm (43 in × 27.0 in)
- Location: Private collection

Charlie Is My Darling is an 1864 oil painting by the British artist John Everett Millais. The title is taken from an eighteenth century Jacobite song of the same name referring to Charles Edward Stuart. It is suggested that the young woman, fashionably attired for the Georgian era, is humming the tune while waiting on a mounting block for her horse. Her sympathies for the Jacobite cause are also indicated by the white cockade she wears, a traditional symbol of allegiance to the exiled Stuart monarchs.

Depictions of Jacobites are a recurring theme in the work of Millais. The painting was displayed at the Royal Academy Exhibition of 1864 at the National Gallery in London. Millais also produced two smaller oil versions as well as a watercolour.

== See also ==
- List of paintings by John Everett Millais

== Bibliography ==
- Fish, Arthur. John Everett Millais, 1829–1896. Funk & Wagnalls, 1923.
- Nicholson, Robin. Bonnie Prince Charlie and the Making of a Myth: A Study in Portraiture, 1720–1892. Bucknell University Press, 2002.
- Phillips, Catherine. Gerard Manley Hopkins and the Victorian Visual World. Oxford University Press, 2007.
