= 1864 in art =

Events from the year 1864 in art.

== Events ==
- January 30 – National Gallery of Ireland opens to the public in Dublin in a building designed by Francis Fowke based on early plans by Charles Lanyon.
- February 20 – Painter George Frederic Watts marries his 16-year-old model, the actress Ellen Terry, 30 years his junior, in London. She elopes less than a year later.
- May 1 – The Salon of 1864 opens in Paris
- May 2 – The Royal Academy Exhibition of 1864 opens in London
- December 28 – Musée des Beaux-Arts de Mulhouse established.
- December 30 – Julia Margaret Cameron sends John Herschel an album of her first year's photography including her iconic portrait of him.
- The Frances Lehman Loeb Art Center is established as the Vassar College Art Gallery on the women's college campus in Poughkeepsie, New York (in the Hudson Valley) including the Magoon Collection of Hudson River School paintings donated by Matthew Vassar.
- Stanisław Chlebowski takes up a post as master painter to Sultan Abdülaziz in Istanbul.
- The National Gallery in London acquires the 15th century altarpiece The Annunciation, with Saint Emidius from Lord Taunton.

== Awards ==
- Prix de Rome (for sculpture) – Louis-Ernest Barrias

== Works ==
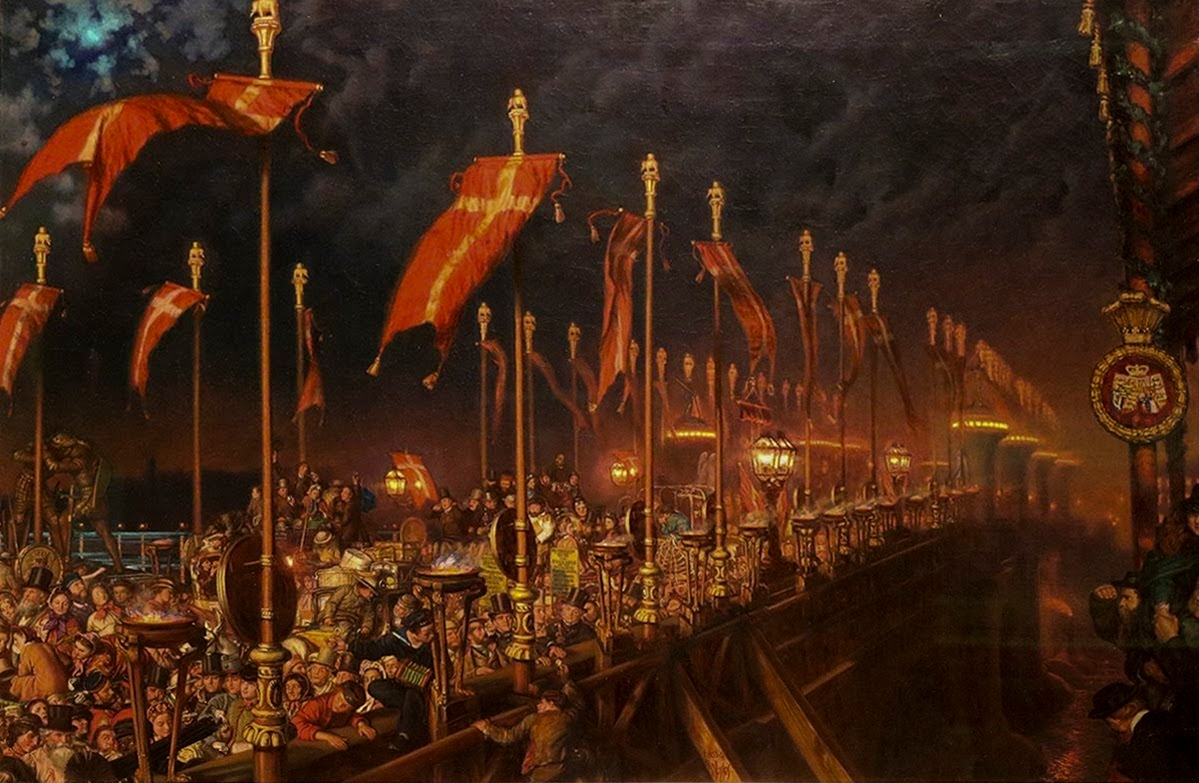
Holman Hunt – London Bridge on the Night of the Marriage of the Prince and Princess of Wales.

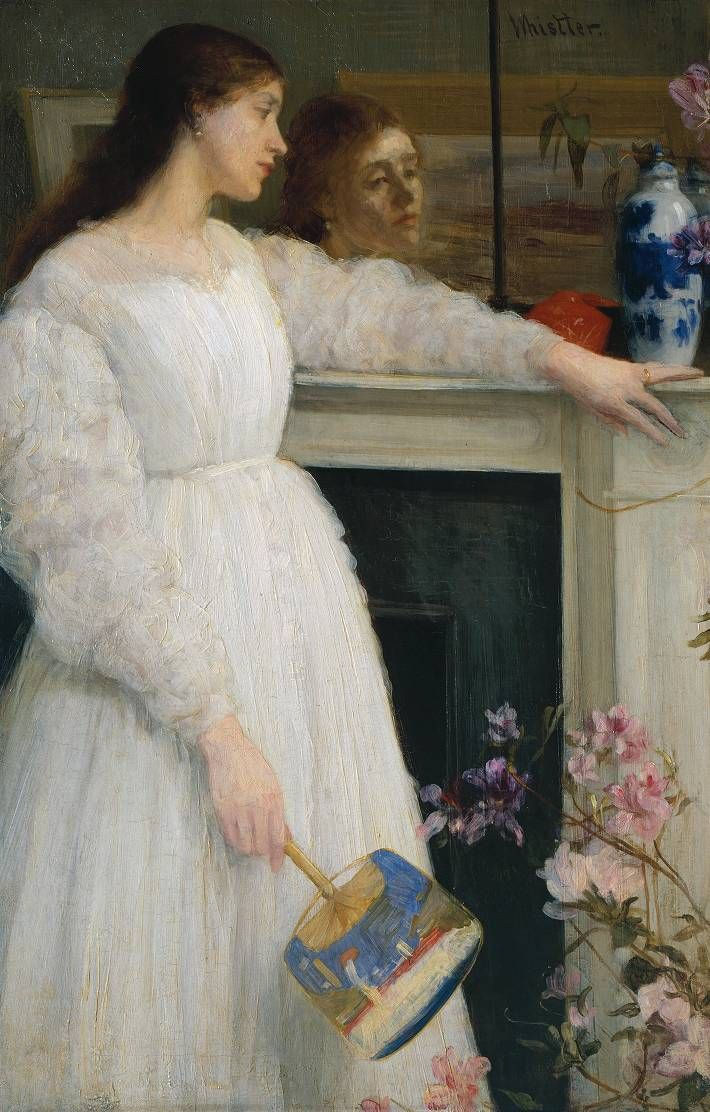
Whistler – The Little White Girl

- Ramon Martí Alsina – The Great Day of Girona
- Frédéric Bazille – The Pink Dress (approximate date)
- François Bocion – Steamer on Lake Geneva – Evening Effect
- John Brett
  - Lady with a Dove
  - Massa, Bay of Naples
- Ford Madox Brown
  - Elijah and the Widow's Son (full-size oil version)
  - King René's Honeymoon
- Francis Bicknell Carpenter – First Reading of the Emancipation Proclamation of President Lincoln
- Edward William Cooke – Scheveningen Pincks off the Coast of Yarmouth
- Jean-Baptiste-Camille Corot – Souvenir de Mortefontaine
- Gustave Courbet - The Oak at Flagey
- Richard Dadd – The Fairy Feller's Master-Stroke
- Honoré Daumier – The Third-Class Carriage (Metropolitan Museum of Art, New York)
- Alfred Elmore – On the Brink
- Thomas Farrell – Memorial statue to John McNeil Boyd (St Patrick's Cathedral, Dublin)
- Anselm Feuerbach – Paolo and Francesca
- Konstantin Flavitsky – Princess Tarakanova
- Mariano Fortuny - Battle of Tetuán (unfinished)
- Francesco Hayez – Portrait of Massimo d'Azeglio
- James Clarke Hook – From Under the Sea
- William Holman Hunt – London Bridge on the Night of the Marriage of the Prince and Princess of Wales
- Sir Edwin Landseer – Man Proposes, God Disposes
- Henri Fantin-Latour
  - Homage to Delacroix
  - White Cup and Saucer
- Jean-Paul Laurens – The Death of Tiberius
- Frederic Leighton – The Painter's Honeymoon
- John Frederick Lewis – Captive Dove, Cairo
- Daniel Maclise – The Death of Nelson (wall painting for Palace of Westminster and oil study)
- Édouard Manet
  - Les Anges au tombeau du Christ, Le Christ mort aux anges ("The Angels at Christ's Tomb") (Metropolitan Museum of Art, New York)
  - The Battle of the Kearsarge and the Alabama (Philadelphia Museum of Art)
  - Branch of White Peonies and Pruning Shears (Musée d'Orsay, Paris)
  - Peonies (Metropolitan Museum of Art, New York)
  - The Dead Toreador (National Gallery of Art, Washington, D.C.)
  - Women at the Races (Cincinnati Art Museum)
- Jan Matejko
  - Kazanie Skargi
  - Polonia
- Jean-Louis-Ernest Meissonier – 1814: The Campaign in France (Musée d'Orsay, Paris)
- John Everett Millais – Charlie Is My Darling
- Jean-François Millet – Shepherdess with Her Flock (Musée d'Orsay, Paris)
- Gustave Moreau – Oedipus and the Sphinx
- Erskine Nicol – Irish Emigrants Waiting for a Train
- Henry Nelson O'Neil – The Landing of Princess Alexandra at Gravesend
- Val Prinsep – My Lady Betty
- William Blake Richmond – The Sisters
- Frederick Sandys – Morgan le Fay
- Emil Jakob Schindler – A Forest Blacksmith
- Simeon Solomon – Sappho and Erinna in a Garden at Mytilene
- James Tissot
  - Japanese Girl Bathing
  - Portrait of Mademoiselle L.L.
- G. F. Watts – Choosing
- James McNeill Whistler
  - The Balcony
  - Chelsea in Ice
  - Caprice in Purple and Gold: The Golden Screen
  - Symphony in White, No. 2: The Little White Girl
  - Wapping
- Franz Xaver Winterhalter
  - Carlota of Belgium
  - Madame Barbe de Rimsky-Korsakov (Musée d'Orsay, Paris)
  - Portrait of Alexandra of Denmark
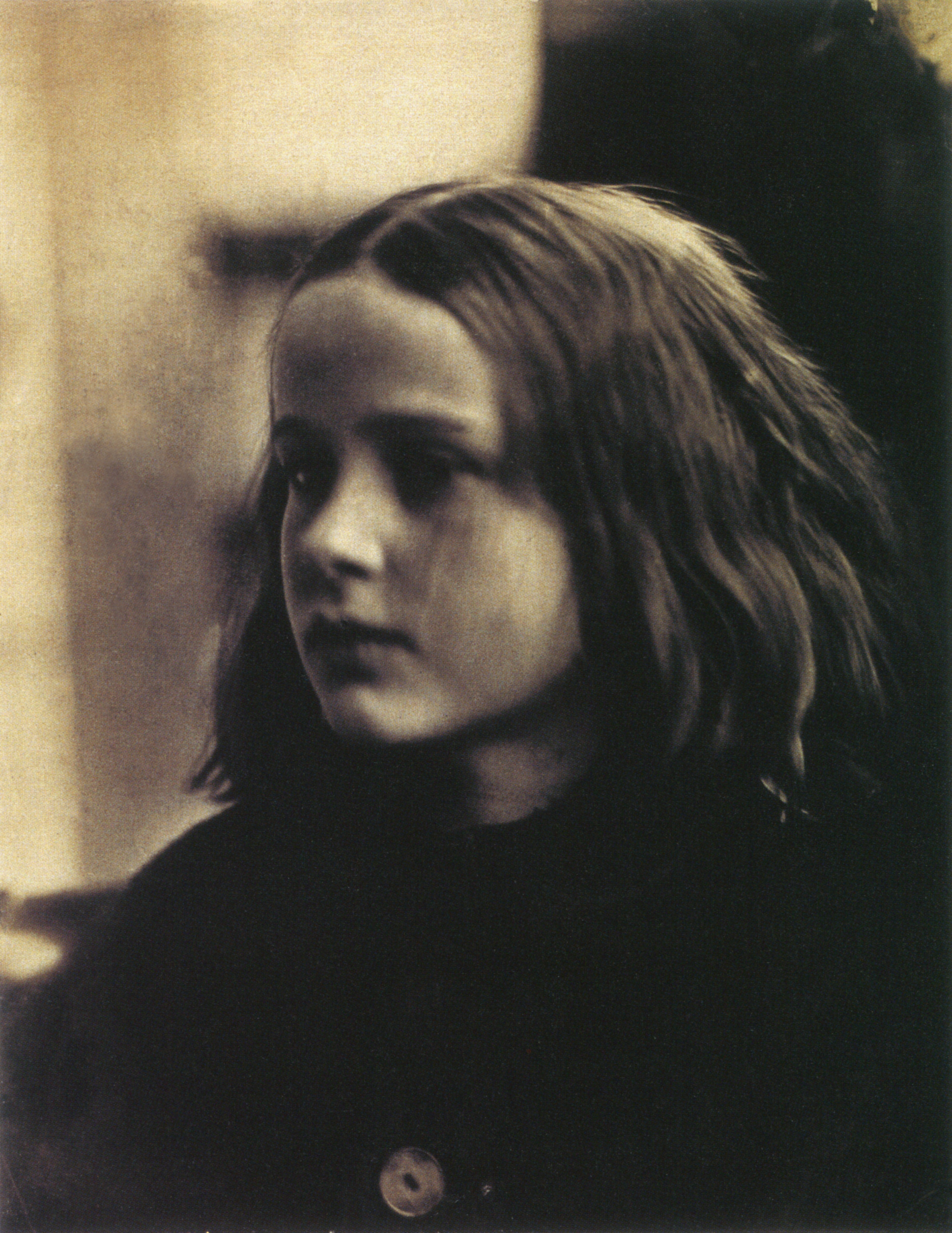
29 January 1864: "Annie, my first success", Julia Margaret Cameron's first satisfactory print

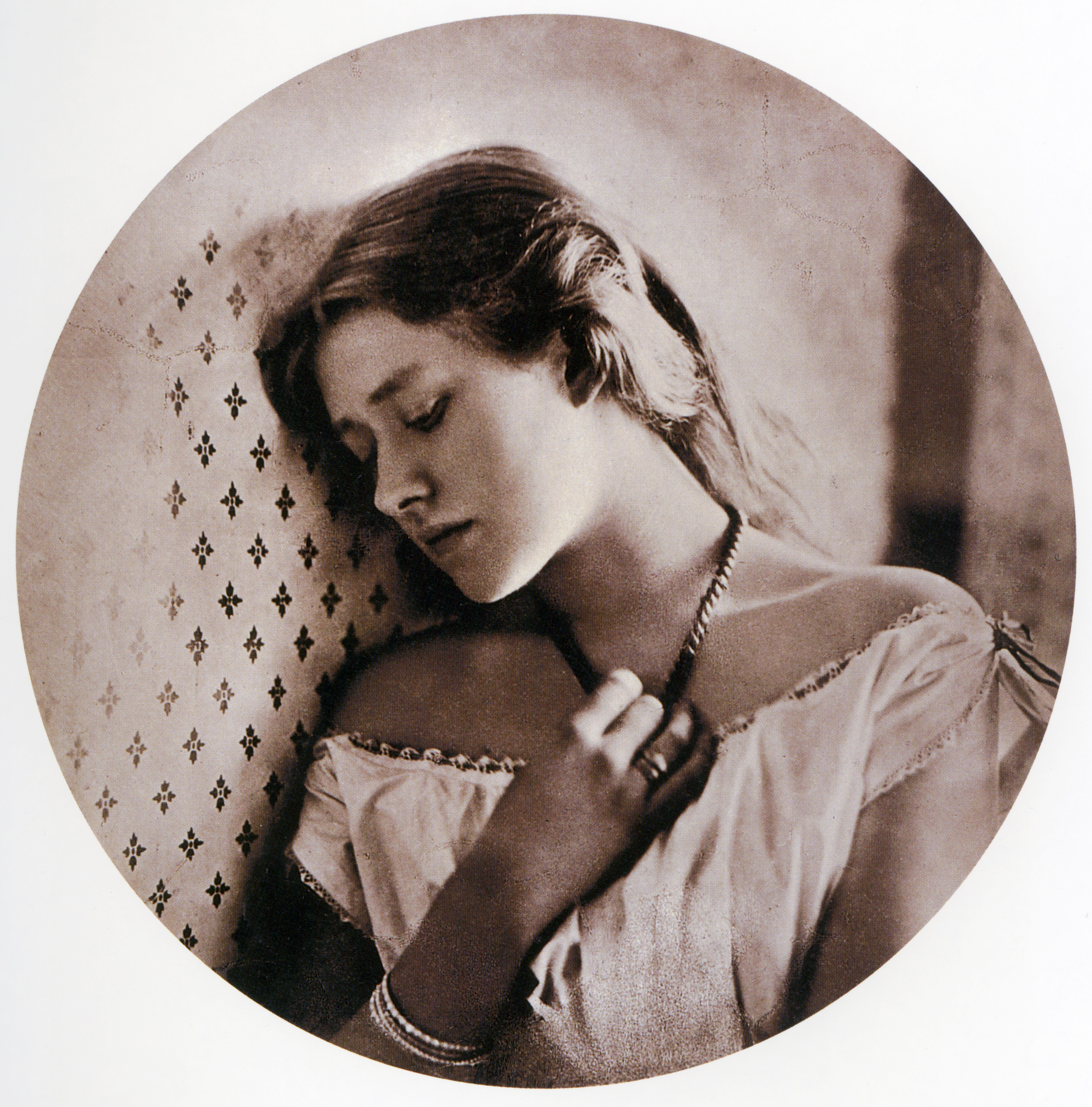
Sadness: Ellen Terry photographed in 1864 by Julia Margaret Cameron

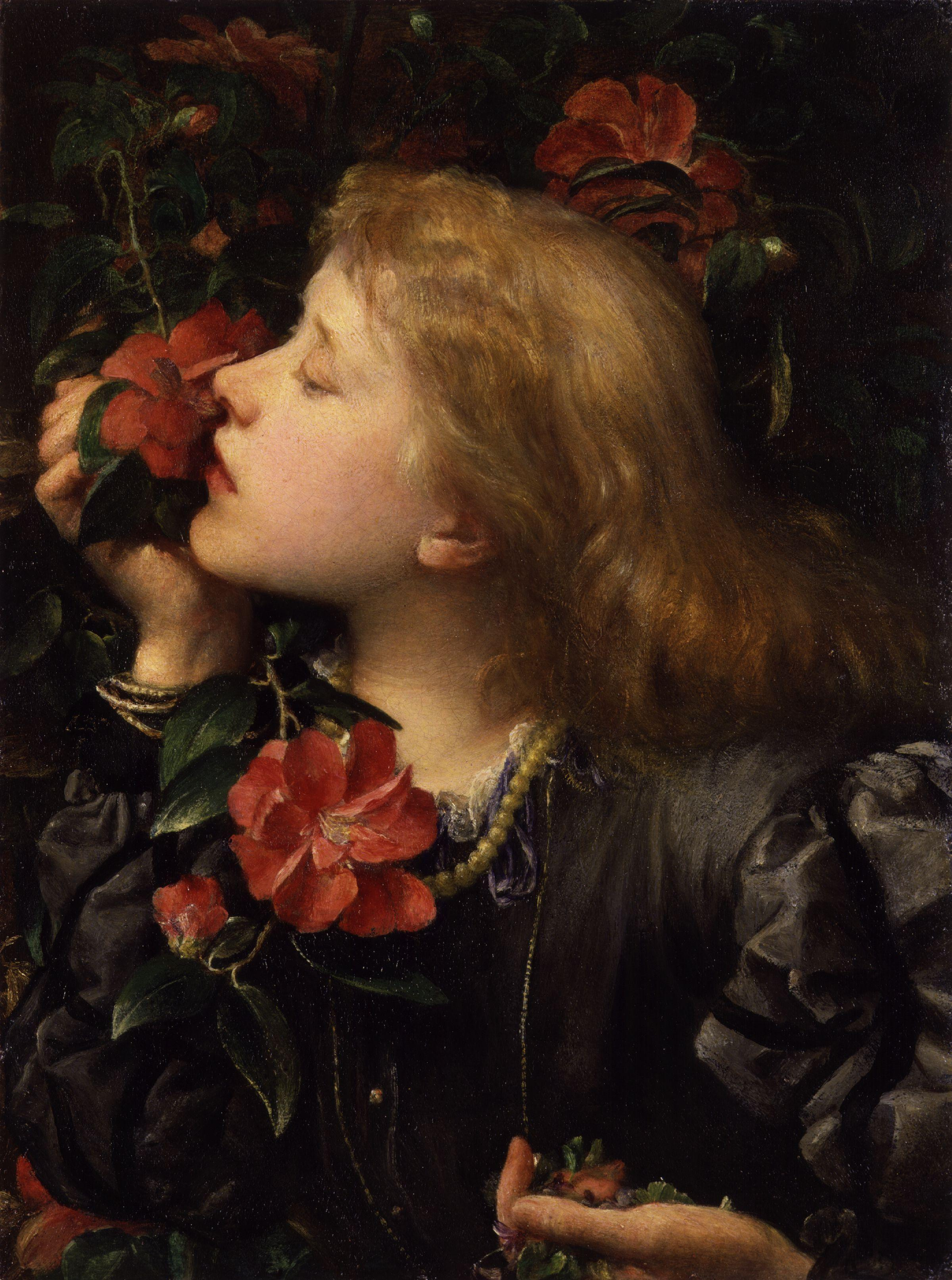
Choosing: Ellen Terry painted by her husband of 1864 G. F. Watts

== Births ==
- January 3 – Ernst Klimt, Austrian mural painter (died 1892)
- February 1 – Albert Julius Olsson, English marine painter (died 1942)
- March 10 – Ādams Alksnis, Latvian painter (died 1897)
- March 19 – Charles Marion Russell, American "cowboy artist" (died 1926)
- March 29 – Paul Ranson, French painter and writer (died 1909)
- April 9 – Archibald Knox, Manx designer (died 1933)
- May 15 – Vilhelm Hammershøi, Danish painter (died 1916)
- May 22 – Willy Stöwer, German marine artist (died 1931)
- July 8 – F. Holland Day, American photographer (died 1933)
- October 7 – Harrington Mann, Scottish-born portrait painter and decorative artist (died 1937)
- November 24 – Henri de Toulouse-Lautrec, French painter (died 1901)
- December 3 – Anna Boberg, Swedish painter (died 1935)
- December 8 – Camille Claudel, French sculptor and graphic artist (died 1943)
- December 13 – John Quinton Pringle, Scottish painter (died 1925)
- December 30 – Marko Murat, Serbian painter (died 1944)
- date unknown
  - Alexander Fisher, English silversmith and enamel painter (died 1936)
  - J. Laurie Wallace, Irish American portrait painter, photographer and model (died 1953)

== Deaths ==
- January 3 – William Behnes, English sculptor (born 1795)
- January 6 – James Frothingham, American painter (born 1786)
- January 27 – Leo von Klenze, German neoclassicist architect, painter and writer (born 1784)
- January 29 – William Cowen, English landscape painter (born 1791)
- February 10 – William Henry Hunt, English watercolor painter (born 1790)
- February 14 – William Dyce, British painter (born 1806)
- March 2 – Jean Alaux, French history painter and Director of the French Academy in Rome (born 1786)
- March 19 – Alexandre Calame, Swiss painter (born 1810)
- March 21 – Jean-Hippolyte Flandrin, French painter (born 1809)
- June 1 – John Watson Gordon, Scottish painter (born 1788)
- June 2 – Caroline Bardua, German painter (born 1781)
- June 8 – Stephen Poyntz Denning, English portraitist, artist and curator (born 1795-1798)
- July 27 – Joseph Patrick Haverty, Irish painter (born 1794)
- August 7 – Johann Pucher (Janez Puhar), Slovene painter and photographer (born 1814)
- August 10 – Thomas Baker "of Leamington", English landscape painter (born 1809)
- November 15 – Abel Dimier, French sculptor (born 1794)
- November 20 – Albert Newsam, American graphic artist (born 1809
- November 25 – David Roberts, Scottish painter (born 1796)
- December 24 – Demeter Laccataris, Austro-Hungarian portrait painter of Greek origin (born 1798)
- date unknown
  - Carlo Restallino, Italian-born painter and engraver (born 1776)
  - William Guy Wall, Irish-born painter working in the United States (born 1792)
