= Longships Lighthouse =

Lighthouse off Land's End, England

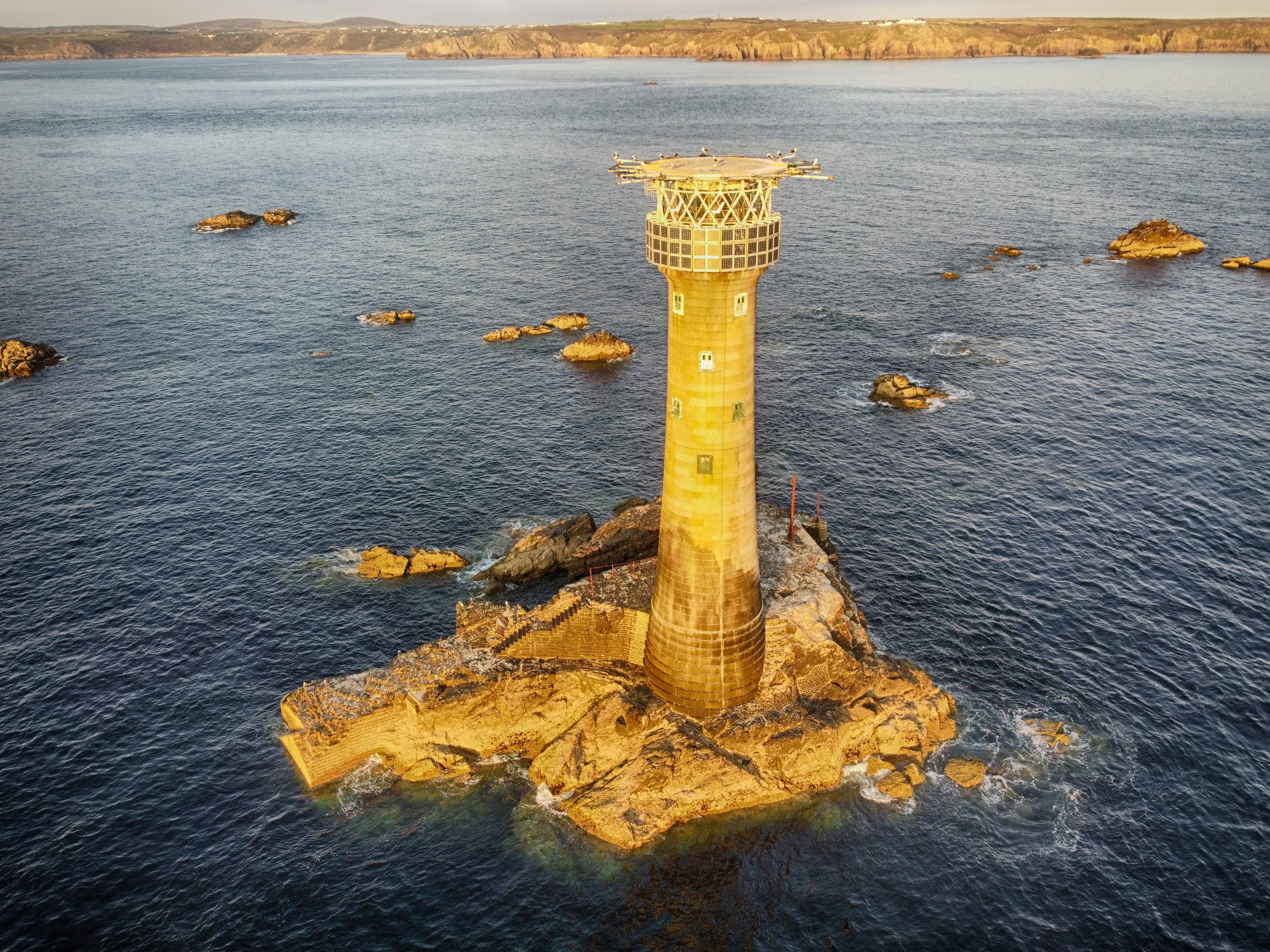
- Longships lighthouse from the seaward side
- Location: Longships, Land's End; Cornwall; England
- Coordinates: 50°4′00.69″N 5°44′48.39″W

Tower
- Constructed: 1795 (first)
- Construction: granite tower
- Automated: 1988
- Height: 35 m (115 ft)
- Shape: tapered cylindrical tower with lantern and helipad on the top
- Markings: unpainted tower, white lantern
- Operator: Trinity House
- Fog signal: one second blast every 10 seconds

Light
- First lit: 1875 (current)
- Focal height: 35 m (115 ft)
- Lens: First Order Dioptric
- Intensity: 14,400 Candela
- Range: 15 nmi (28 km; 17 mi)
- Characteristic: Fl (2) WR 10s.

Longships Lighthouse is an active 19th-century lighthouse about 1.25 mi (2.0 km) off the coast of Land's End in Cornwall, England. It is the second lighthouse to be built on Carn Bras, the highest of the Longships islets which rises 39 feet (12 m) above high water level. In 1988 the lighthouse was automated, and the keepers withdrawn. It is now remotely monitored from the Trinity House Operations & Planning Centre in Harwich, Essex.

== History ==
In the second half of the 18th century, Trinity House was petitioned repeatedly by ship owners for a lighthouse to be built on one of the rocks off Land's End. In 1790 John Smeaton surveyed the area, and recommended either Wolf Rock or the Longships reef as potentially suitable locations. Trinity House sought a leaseholder, who would be responsible for building the tower and maintaining the light in return for the right to levy dues on passing ships. The lease was eventually granted, for a period of fifty years, to a Lieutenant Henry Smith (who had previously been involved in trying to establish a beacon on the rocks). He engaged Samuel Wyatt, who had recently been appointed the Surveyor of Trinity House, as architect for the project. Work on site began in 1793; however, Smith underestimated the time required and costs involved, and struggled to raise sufficient funds (since the levying of dues depended on the lighthouse being operational). He took out expensive loans to see the work through, but was unable to repay them as promised; (he ended up being sent to the Fleet Prison as a debtor in 1801).

=== The first lighthouse ===
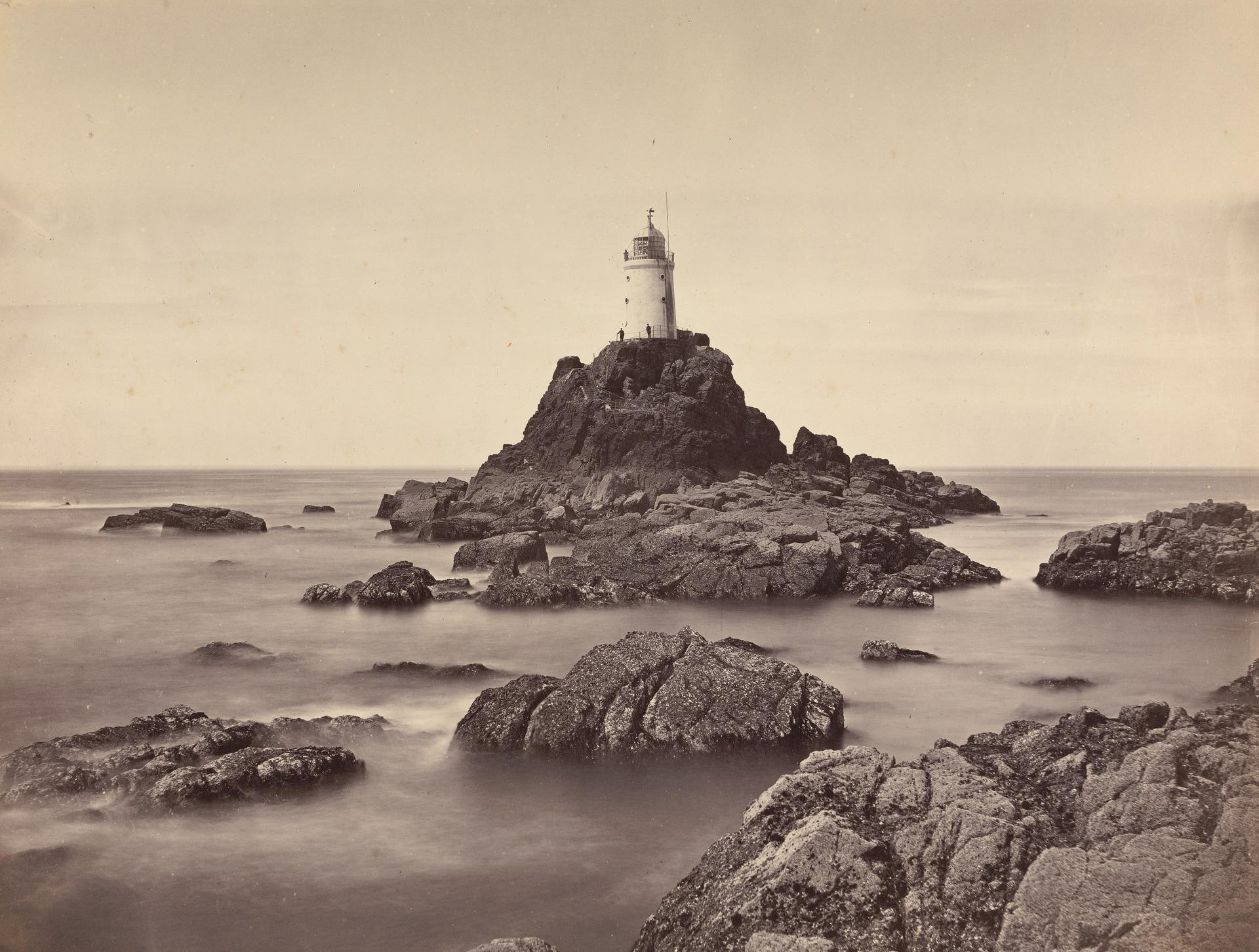
The original Longships Lighthouse, photographed in the 1860s.

Smith's lighthouse was first lit on 29 September 1795. Built to Wyatt's design, it was a round tower, three storeys high and built of granite, on top of which was a glazed lantern storey with a copper-covered dome. Within the tower itself, the lower level contained a water tank and coal store, the middle floor housed the oil tanks and a kitchen, while the top floor served as a bedroom. The lantern contained a fixed array of eighteen Argand lamps with reflectors, arranged in two tiers and shining out to sea, probably the first time Argand lamps and reflectors had been installed in an offshore lighthouse. The tower was only just over 38 feet (12 m) high, but was built on top of a rock pinnacle meaning that the lantern was 79 feet (24 m) above sea level; nevertheless very high seas obscured its light. In the early 19th century it was staffed by two teams of two keepers, each team being on station for a month at a time.

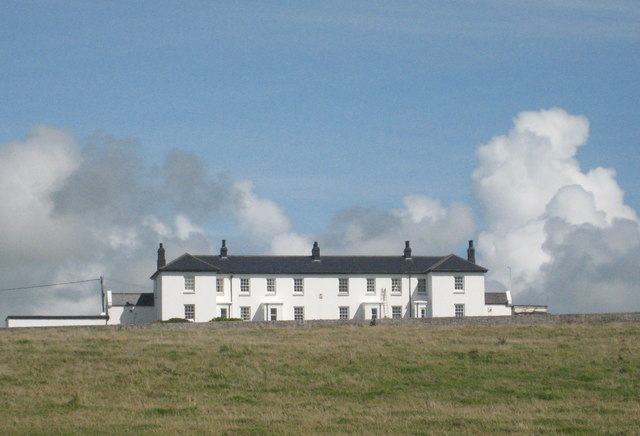
The keepers' cottages on the mainland remained in use until 1988.

In 1836, Trinity House bought out the lease of the Longships (and other remaining privately owned lighthouses). The Corporation built a set of keepers' dwellings onshore, near Sennen Cove, in 1855, facing the lighthouse out to sea; keepers' families lived there, as did the keepers themselves when not on station. By this time there were still four keepers, but three now occupied the lighthouse while one (by monthly rotation) was ashore.

=== The current lighthouse ===
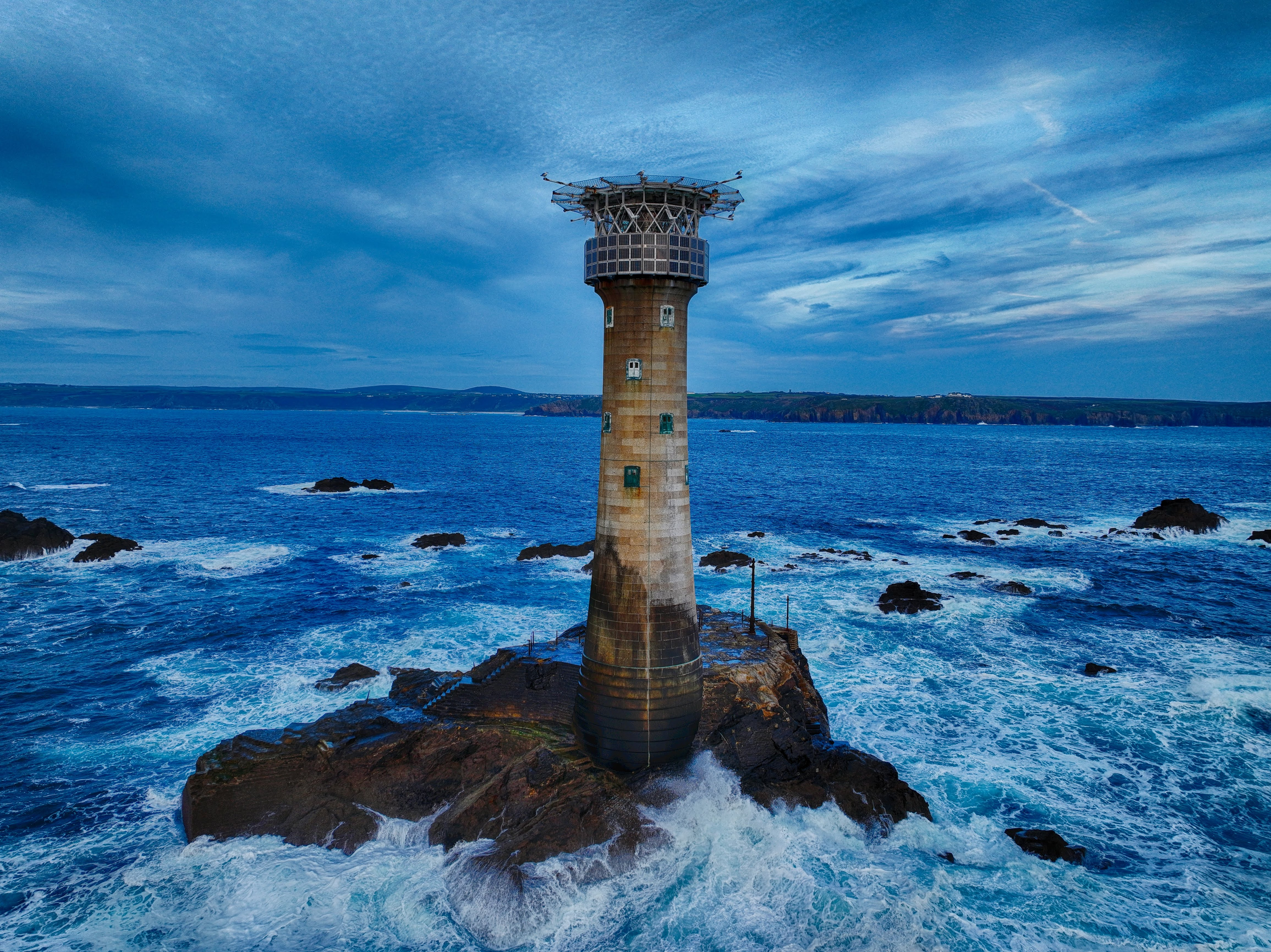
Longships Lighthouse (2023).

In 1869 Trinity House began constructing a replacement tower to the designs of William Douglass. The building of the present granite tower used much of the equipment that had previously been used in the construction of the Wolf Rock Lighthouse; construction was supervised by Michael Beazeley, who had been assistant engineer to Douglass at Wolf Rock. The new lighthouse was just over 117 feet (36 m) tall. It was equipped with a first-order fixed catadioptric optic built by Dr John Hopkinson of Chance Brothers. The lens array, itself over 9 feet (2.7 m) tall, was placed on a 4-foot-9-inch (1.45 m) pedestal within the lantern; the light source was an eight-wick 'Douglass' oil lamp, powered by colza.

The tower was first lit in December 1873, having cost £43,870 to build, and displayed a fixed white light with two red sectors (to warn ships away from the Brisons, to the north-east, and Rundlestone, to the south-east). Initially the new lighthouse was fitted with a fog bell, which sounded two strokes every fifteen seconds; After the new tower was completed Wyatt's tower was dismantled and the higher pinnacles of rock on Carn Bras were removed.

In 1883 Longstone was altered to show an occulting light (eclipsed for three seconds every minute). An explosive fog signal was introduced at the same time, using Brock fog rockets to sound a signal twice every ten minutes. The bell was retained for use as an alternative signal, put to use if the explosive signal was not working, until 1897 when it was removed. Even after these improvements, however, the S.S. Bluejacket was wrecked on rocks near the lighthouse on a clear night in 1898, nearly demolishing the lighthouse in the process. Often due to bad weather there was a delay in relieving the men and supplying stores. In January 1901 there was some concern that the men had run short of provisions due to the severe weather. It was found that there was plenty of stores and the only hardship was their lack of tobacco. They had taken to smoking coffee, hops and tea leaves instead. The explosive signal was altered to sound twice every five minutes in 1899.

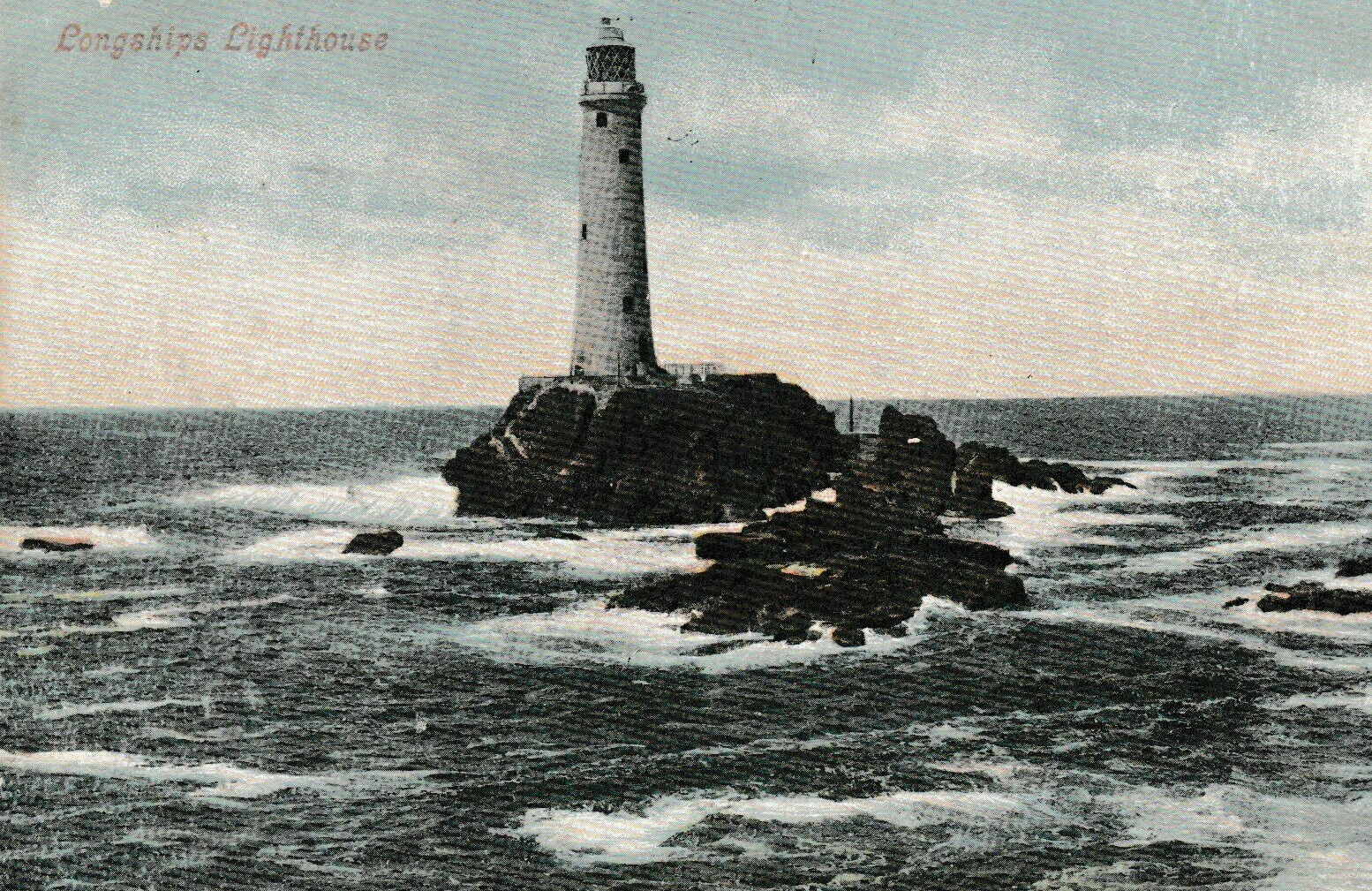
A 1904 picture postcard of the lighthouse.

In 1904 the multi-wick lamp was replaced with a Matthews incandescent oil burner. A new Matthews-designed explosive fog signal apparatus was also installed on the lantern gallery at around the same time. In 1925 the lamp was again replaced, this time with a Hood petroleum vapour burner.

In 1967 the light was electrified and the tower modified: the 1873 optic was removed and in its place a pair of Lister diesel generator sets were installed on the old lamp room floor (occupying the lower part of the lantern). Above them an additional floor was inserted to support a new (reduced height) first-order dioptric optic, with an electric lamp replacing the old paraffin burner. It displayed an isophase light (one long five-second flash every ten seconds) and was visible up to 19 nautical miles (35 km) distant. At the same time, the explosive fog signal was removed and a 'supertyfon' fog horn was installed: compressed air was provided by a pair of Worthington-Simpson compressor units to three sounders, each placed alongside its own air tank on the lantern gallery.

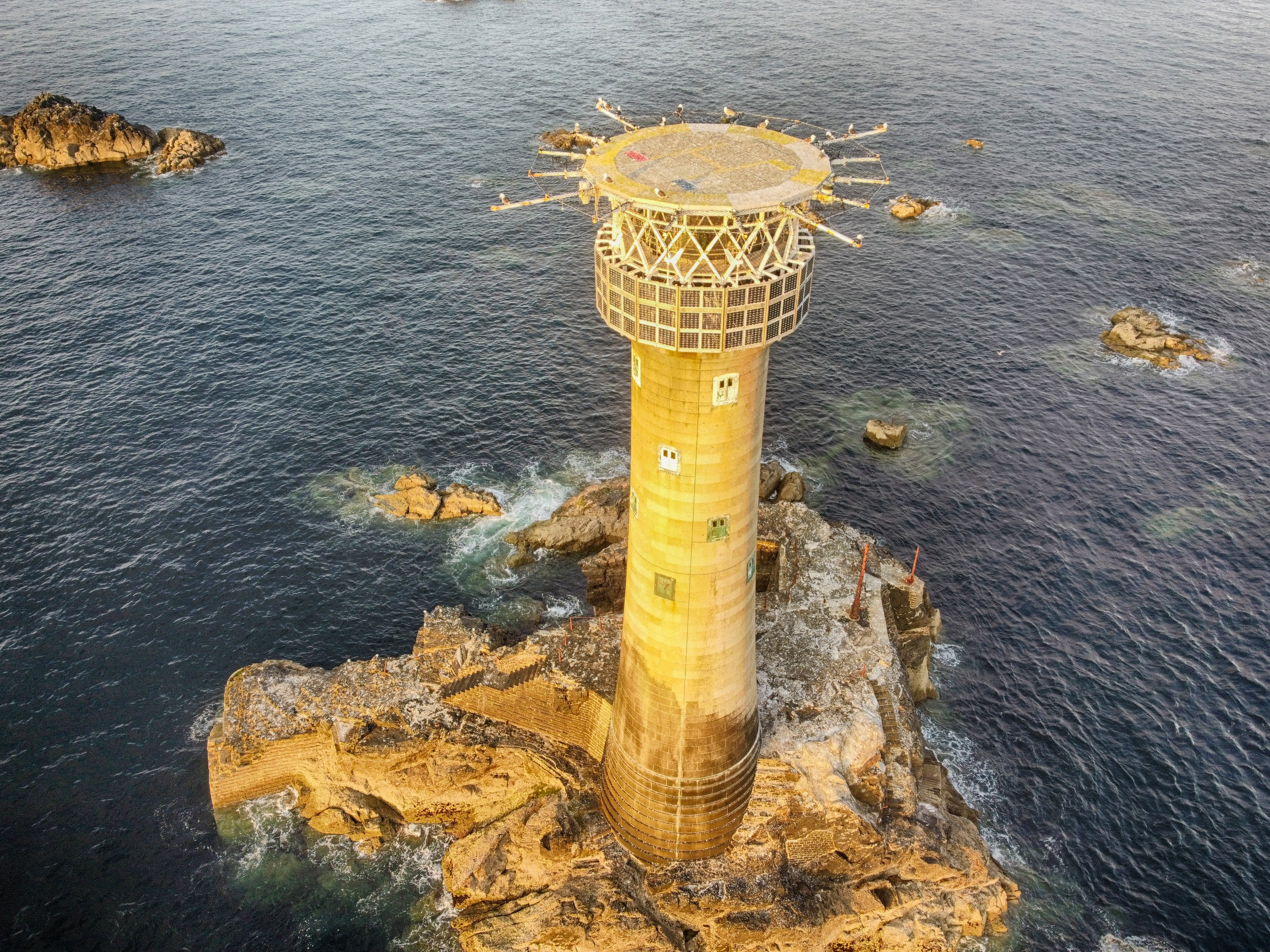
Aerial view of the helipad on the lighthouse

In 1974 a helipad was constructed on top of the lantern, greatly easing access.

In 1988 the lighthouse was automated: the keepers were withdrawn, a new set of generators was installed and the fog horn was replaced by a new electric emitter. It was initially monitored by a telemetry link from the Lizard Lighthouse; since 1996 it has been monitored from Harwich.

In February 2025, a technical fault caused the fog horn to sound every 13 seconds. This was fixed in March 2025, with Trinity House explaining that "the noise was the result of a technical issue which caused the low visibility hazard warning signal to sound even when the view was clear".

== Operation ==
The light was converted to solar power in 2005; it now flashes twice every ten seconds. Seaward flashes are white but they become red – due to tinted sectors – for any vessel straying too close to either Cape Cornwall to the north or Gwennap Head to the south-southeast. The white light has a range of 15 nautical miles (28 km; 17 mi), and the red sector light a slightly shorter range of 11 nautical miles (20 km; 13 mi). During poor visibility the fog horn sounds once every ten seconds.

== Gallery ==
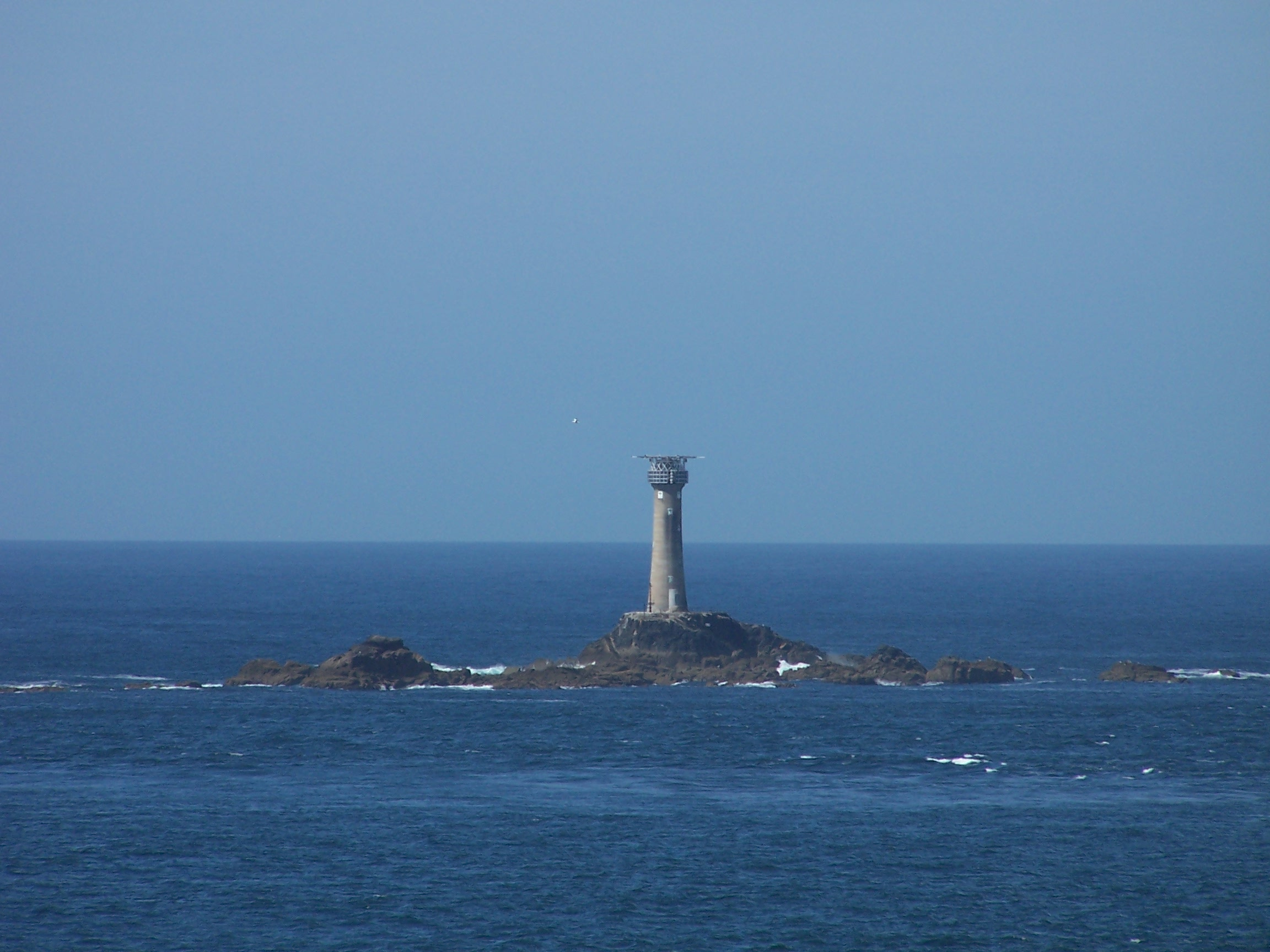
Longships lighthouse from the landward side.

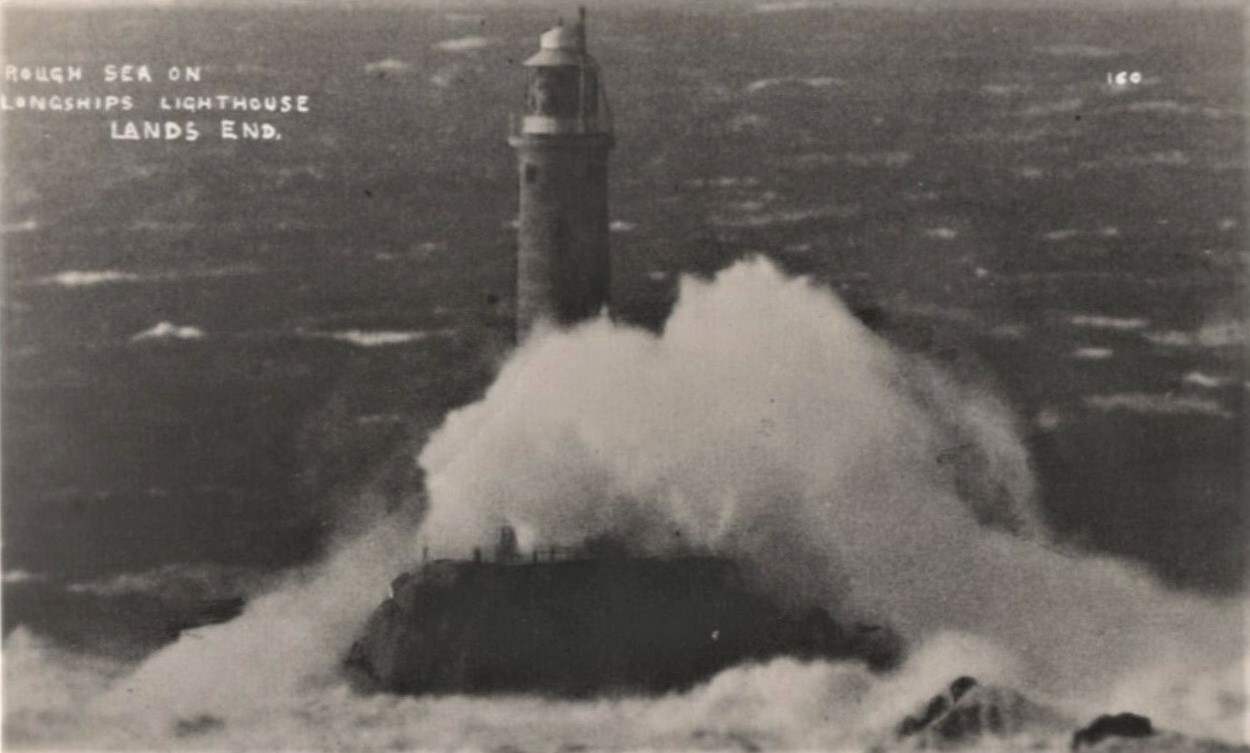
The lighthouse on a windy day in 1938.

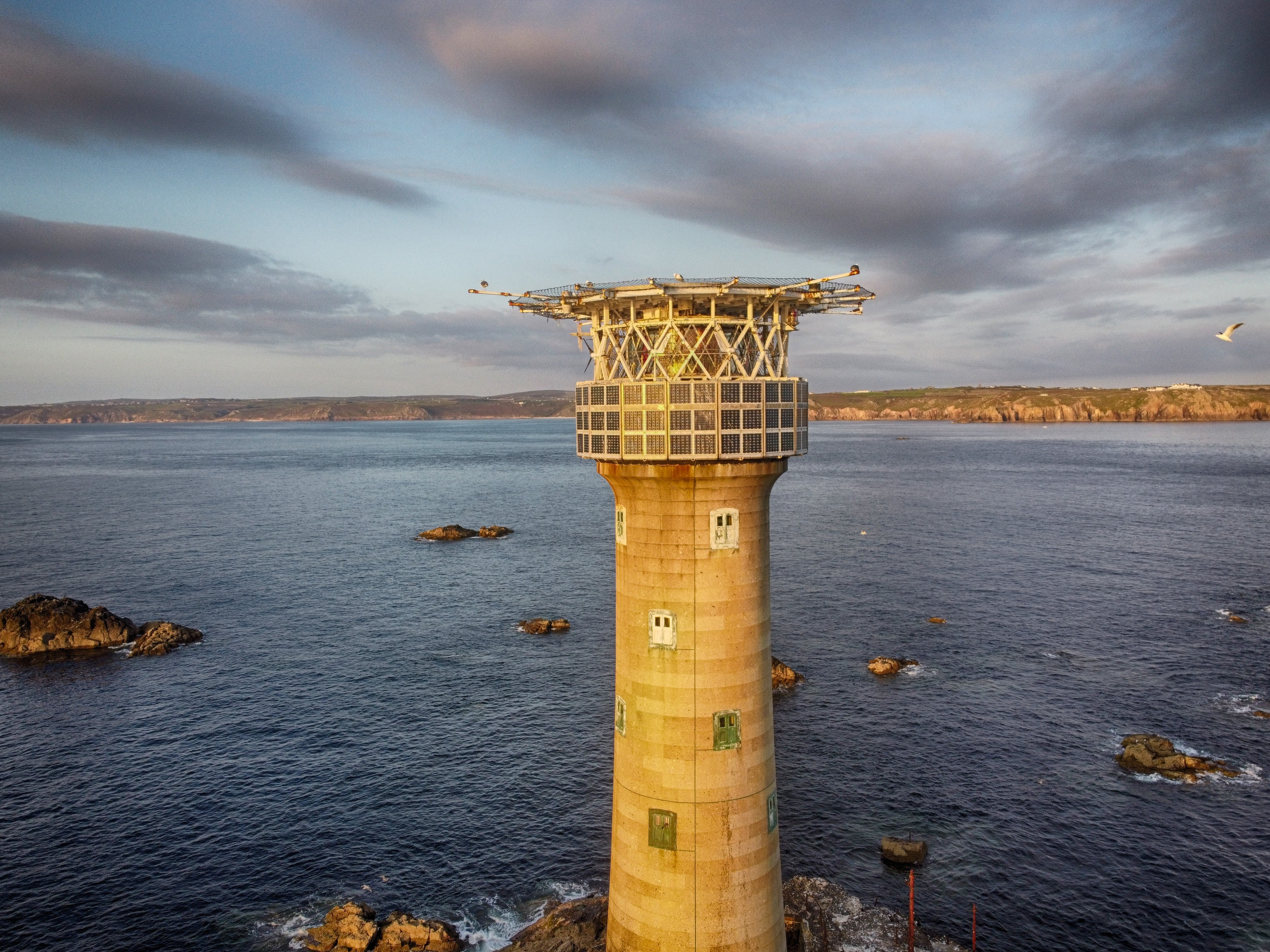
As of 2021 solar panels surround the lower half of the lantern.

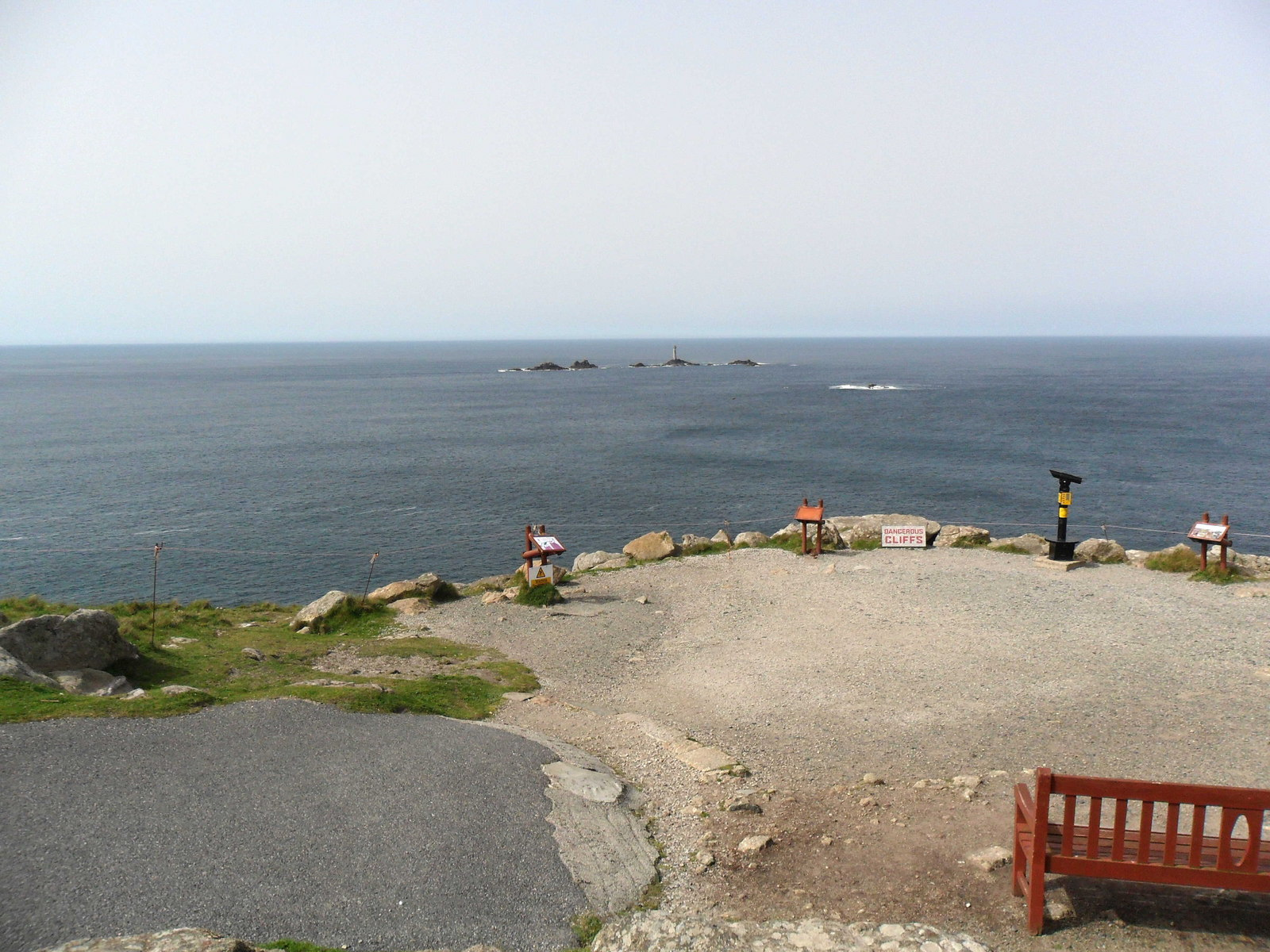
View of the lighthouse from Land's End.

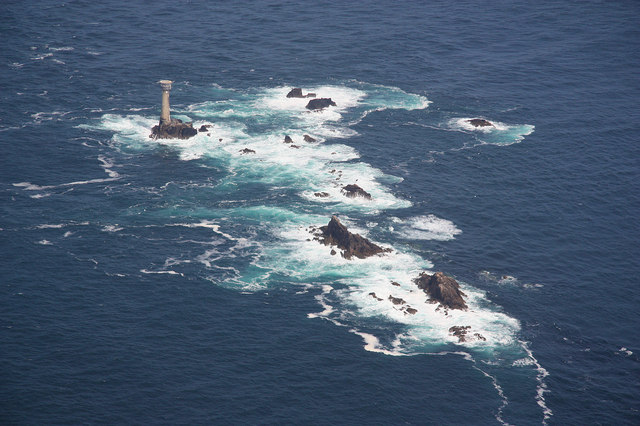
Aerial view of the rocks.

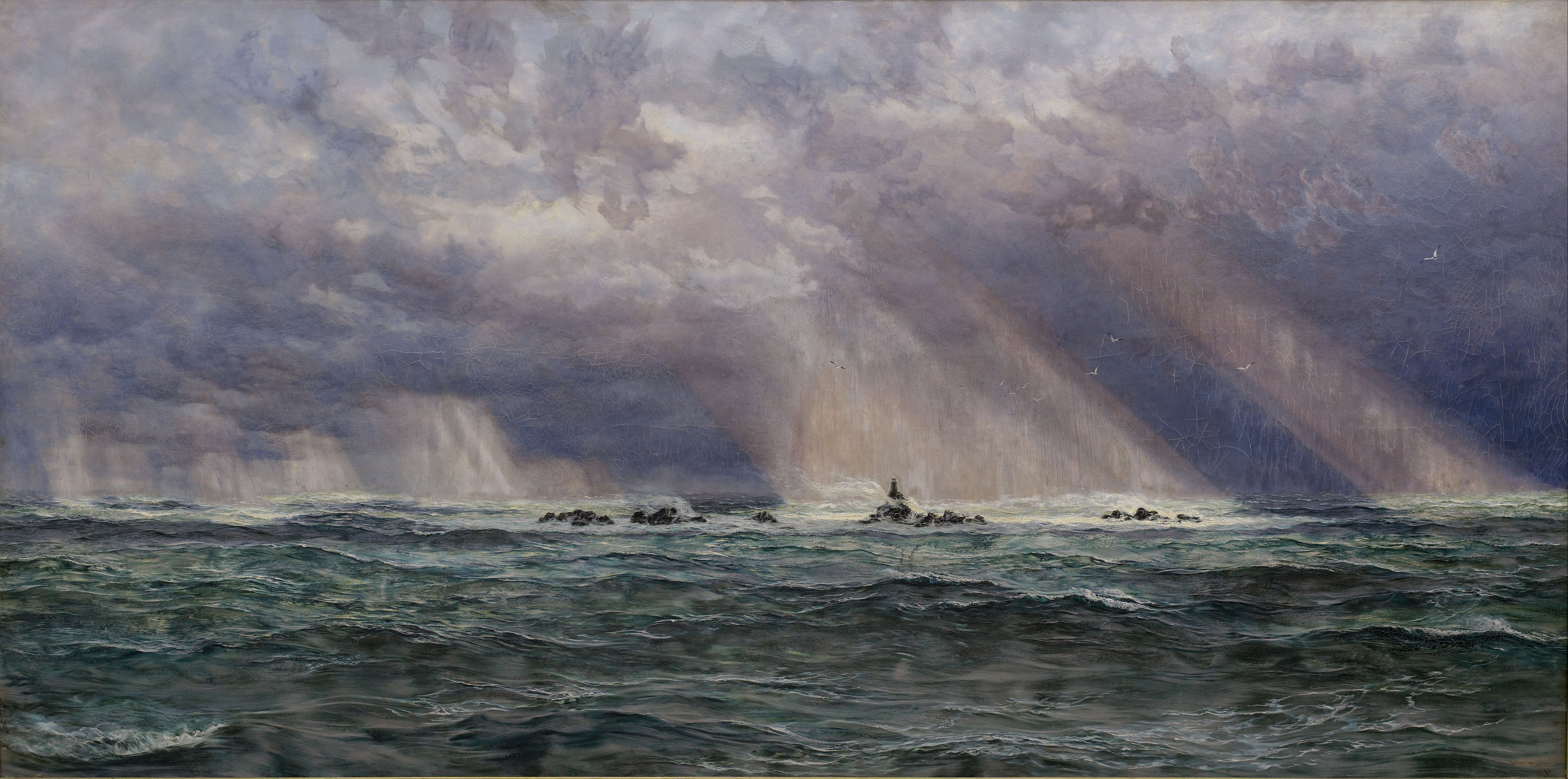
A North-West Gale off the Longships Lighthouse by John Brett, 1873

== See also ==
- List of lighthouses in England
