= Echoes of a Far-Off Storm =

Painting by John Brett

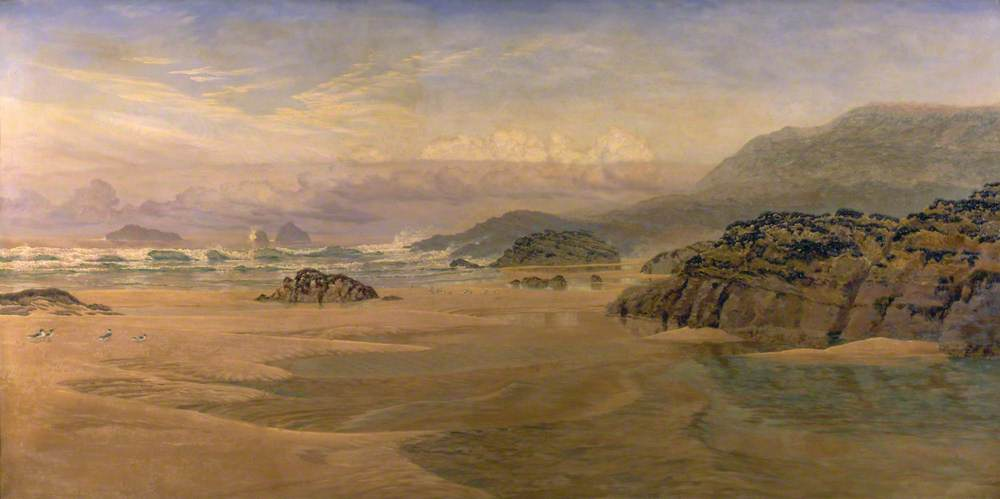
- Artist: John Brett
- Year: 1890
- Type: Oil on canvas, landscape painting
- Dimensions: 107 cm × 213 cm (42 in × 84 in)
- Location: Guildhall Art Gallery, London

Echoes of a Far-Off Storm is an oil onj canvas landscape painting by the British artist John Brett, from 1890.

The painting was inspired by a trip Brett had made to the Cornish resort of Padstow the previous year. Brett was associated with the Pre-Raphaelite Brotherhood early in his career.

The painting was displayed at the Royal Academy Exhibition of 1890 held at Burlington House in Piccadilly. Today the painting is part of the collection of the City of London's Guildhall Art Gallery, having been offered by Sir Thomas Lane Devitt in 1918.

== Bibliography ==
- Brett, Charles, Hickox, Michael & Payne, Christiana. John Brett: A Pre-Raphaelite in Cornwall. Sansom & Company, 2006.
- Payne, Christiana. John Brett: Pre-Raphaelite Landscape Painter. Yale University Press, 2010.
- Roe, Sonia & Oil Paintings in Public Ownership in the City of London of London. Public Catalogue Foundation, 2009.
