= Rosa Brett =

British painter

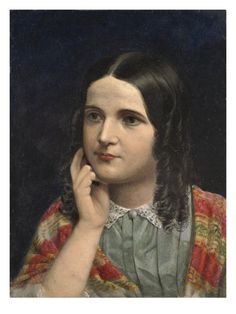
- Born: Rosa Brett; 7 December 1829; Camberwell, London, England, United Kingdom of Great Britain and Ireland
- Died: 31 January 1882 (aged 52); Caterham, Surrey, England
- Movement: Pre-Raphaelite Brotherhood

Rosa Brett (7 December 1829 – 31 January 1882) was a Pre-Raphaelite painter and sister of landscape artist John Brett. Their mother was Ann Brett and their father was an army surgeon, Captain Charles Curtis Brett (1789–1865). Rosa grew up in Dublin, but was known to travel on the continent, spending 1854–55 in Belgium for her health.

Her artistic career was cut short by chronic illness and family demands. She used the pseudonym 'Rosarius' for a period when exhibiting. She never married and died aged 52.

== Artistic career ==
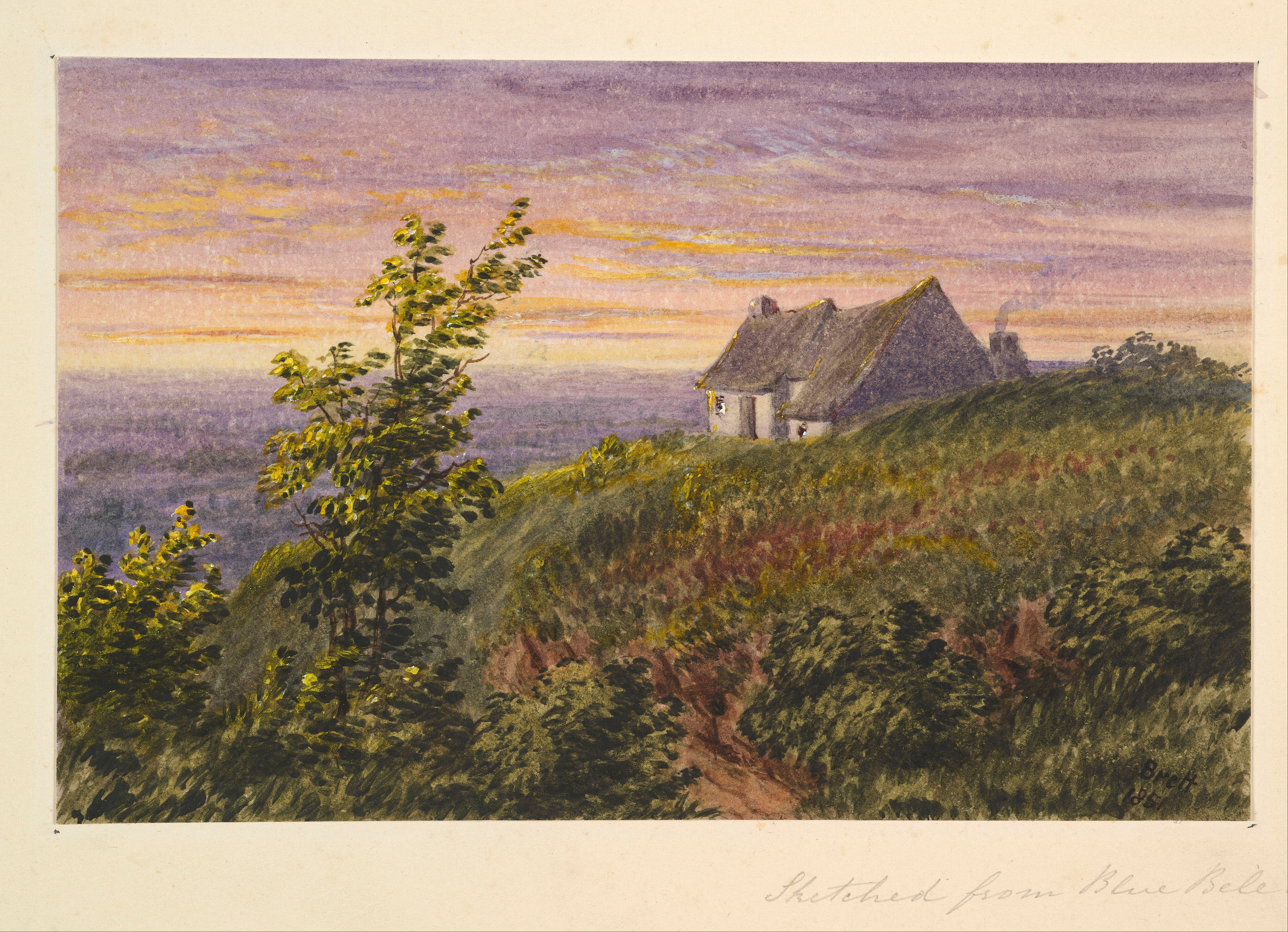
From Bluebell Hill, 1851

Rosa received private artistic training as early as October 1841 and her father paid for lessons for both her and John. Between the years 1850 and 1851 she kept a diary of her time with her brother John, recording their artistic life together when they shared a studio. It is still extant in the Brett family papers. Diary entries record that though they collaborated together, a portion of Rosa's work was sold under her brother's name. Describing an evening when John's pupils came to visit, Rosa said, '[...] I had to make my escape not wishing any one to see me working at the [picture entitled] Fungus as the work passes for John's.'[sic] John referred to her as 'a Diamond sister' in his diaries.

Pamela Gerrish Nunn found within the family archives that Rosa's earliest work dates from 1843. She had sold her first work by 1850 and exhibited several times. Her painting of a cat sitting on a hay bale, The Hayloft was shown at the Royal Academy in 1858. It was favourably reviewed in both the Saturday Review and The Spectator. After the rejection of a second picture for exhibition at the Royal Academy in 1863, she was successful again with a total of nine works including The Field-Mice at Home in 1867, Starling and Bluetit in 1876 and Iris in 1887. She worked in both oils and watercolours and the majority of her works are in private collections.

== List of works ==
- From Bluebell Hill, watercolor, 1851, private collection.
- Birch Tree in our Lawn, sketch, 1852.
- The Hayloft, oil on canvas, 26.5 x 34.7 cm, exh. 1858, private collection.
- In the Artist's Garden, oil on board, 1859–60. Unfinished. In the collection of David Dallas.
- Thistles, oil on canvas, exh. 1861.
- Old House at Farleigh, oil on canvas, 1862.
- The Field-Mice at Home, oil on canvas, exh. 1867.
- Bunny, pencil drawing, May 1873. This drawing depicts the artist's cat.
- Starling and Bluetit, oil on canvas, exh. 1876.
- Snipe, oil on canvas, exh. 1880-1.
- Iris, oil on canvas, exh. 1887.
- A collection of sketchbooks from 1871–2 and 1876-9 were loaned by the National Maritime Museum, Greenwich for 1998 Pre-Raphaelite Women Artists exhibition at Manchester City Art Galleries.
