= Massa, Bay of Naples =

Painting by John Brett

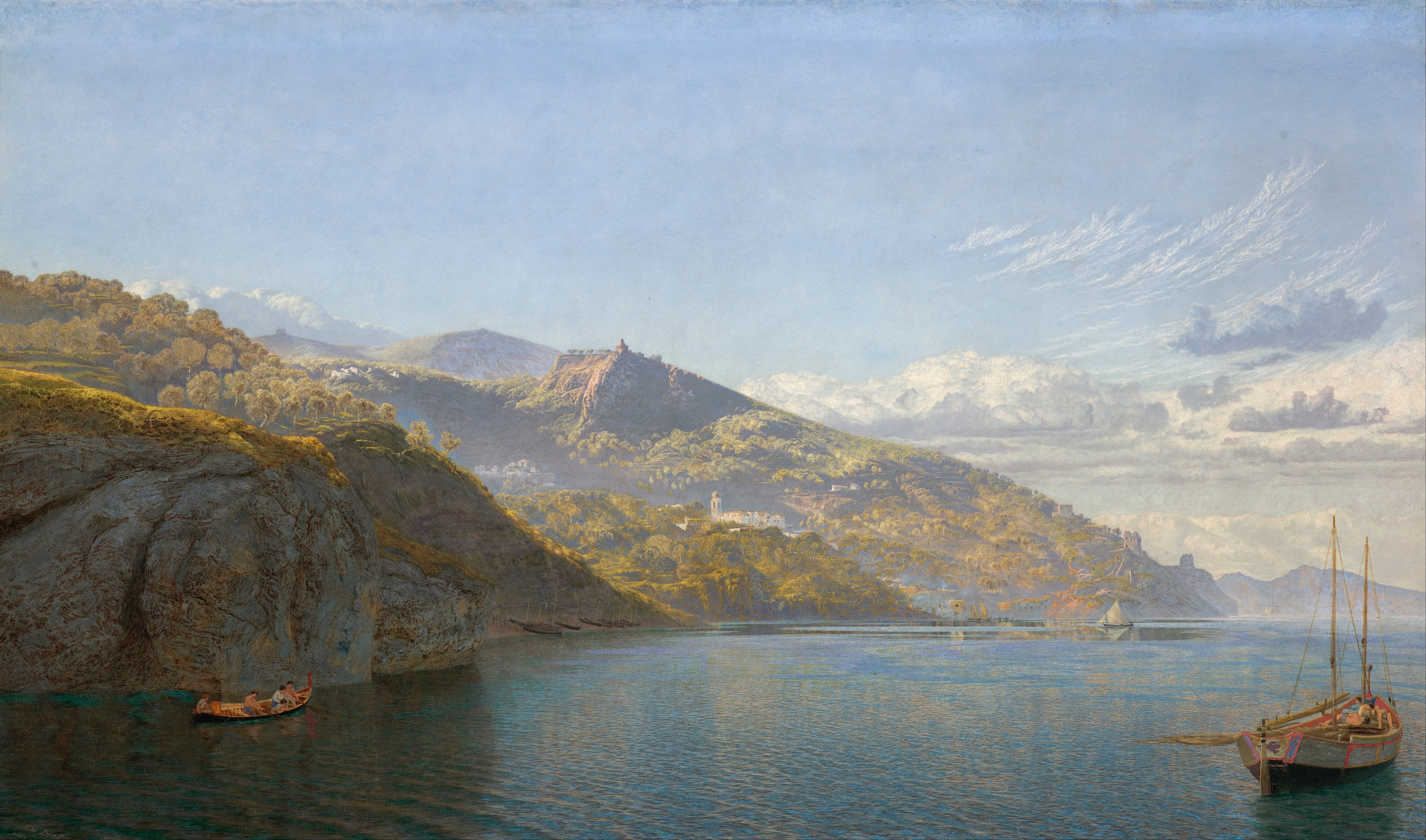
- Artist: John Brett
- Year: 1864
- Type: Oil on canvas, landscape painting
- Dimensions: 71.6 cm × 114.8 cm (28.2 in × 45.2 in)
- Location: Indianapolis Museum of Art, Indiana

Massa, Bay of Naples is an oil on canvas landscape painting by the British artist John Brett, from 1864. It depicts a view of the Bay of Naples which Brett had visited the previous year. Brett was associated with the Pre-Raphaelite Brotherhood.

The painting was displayed at the Royal Academy Exhibition of 1864 held at the National Gallery in London. While his previous submission of the previous year Florence from Bellosguardo had been rejected from the 1863 exhibition, his 1864 works were critically acclaimed. The Art Journal described it as "a picture of remarkable brilliant". It was bought by the art collector Alfred Morrison for 250 guineas. Today it is in the collection of the Indianapolis Museum of Art, which acquired the picture in 1964.

== Bibliography ==
- Janson, Anthony & Fraser, Ian. 100 Masterpieces of Painting: Indianapolis Museum of Art. Indianapolis Museum of Art, 1980.
- Payne, Christiana. John Brett: Pre-Raphaelite Landscape Painter. Yale University Press, 2010.
