= A North-West Gale off the Longships Lighthouse =

Painting by John Brett

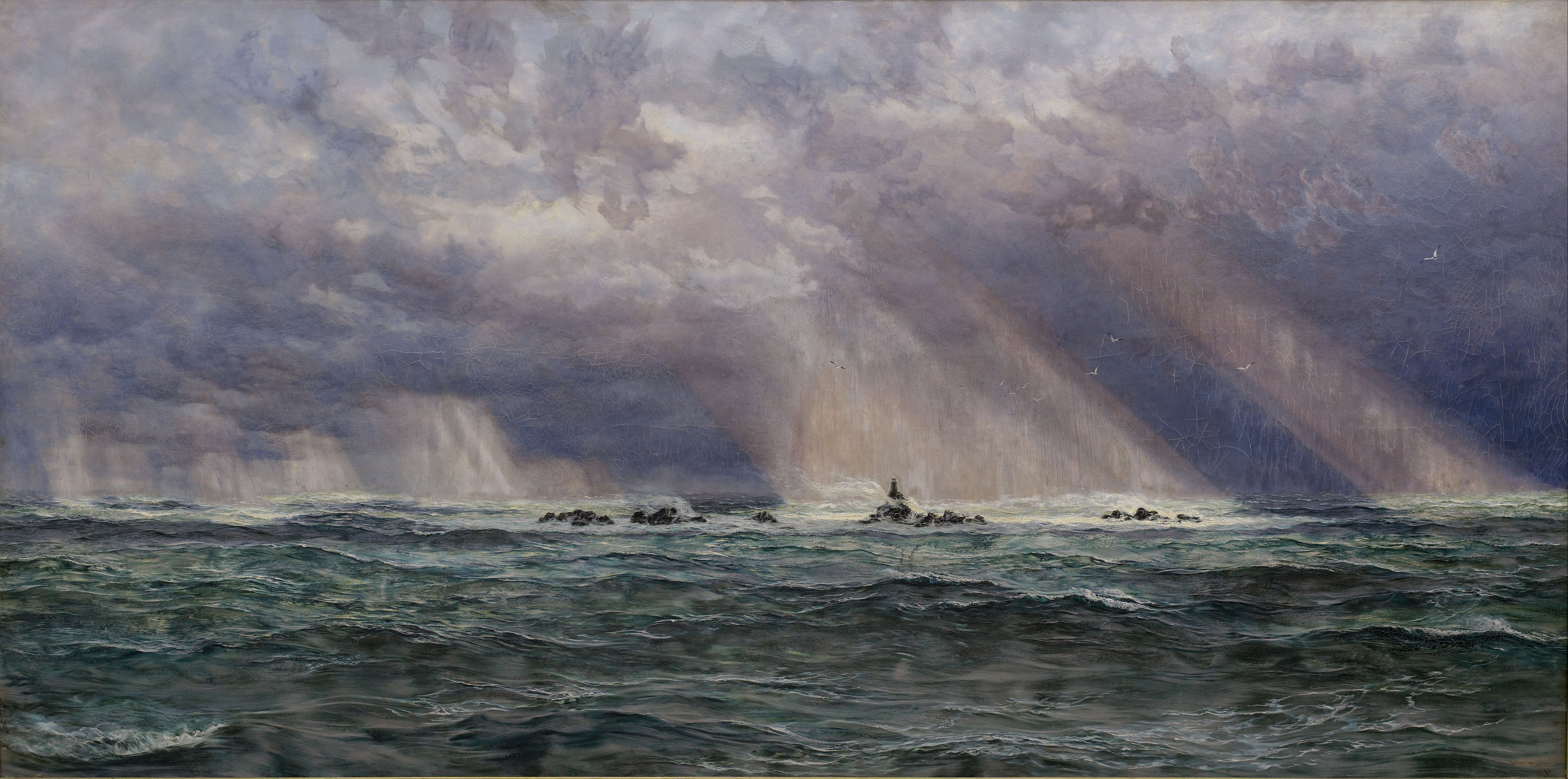
- Artist: John Brett
- Year: 1873
- Type: Oil on canvas, landscape painting
- Dimensions: 105 cm × 212.2 cm (41 in × 83.5 in)
- Location: Birmingham Art Gallery, Birmingham

A North-West Gale off the Longships Lighthouse is an 1873 oil painting by the British artist John Brett. A seascape, it features a view of Longships Lighthouse off the coast of Land's End in Cornwall. It was produced just as the original 1795 lighthouse was being replaced. Brett was part of the Pre-Raphaelite movement and specialised primarily in landscapes. The painting was displayed at the Royal Academy Exhibition of 1873, held at Burlington House in London. It was acquired the same year for the collection of Birmingham Art Gallery.

== Bibliography ==
- Ellis, Andrew & Roe, Sonia. Oil Paintings in Public Ownership in Birmingham. Public Catalogue Foundation, 2008.
- Graham, Edward. Clouds: How to Identify Nature’s Most Fleeting Forms. Princeton University Press, 2025.
- Payne, Christiana. John Brett: Pre-Raphaelite Landscape Painter. Yale University Press, 2010.
