= Longships, Cornwall =

Rocky islets off the coast of Cornwall

Longships
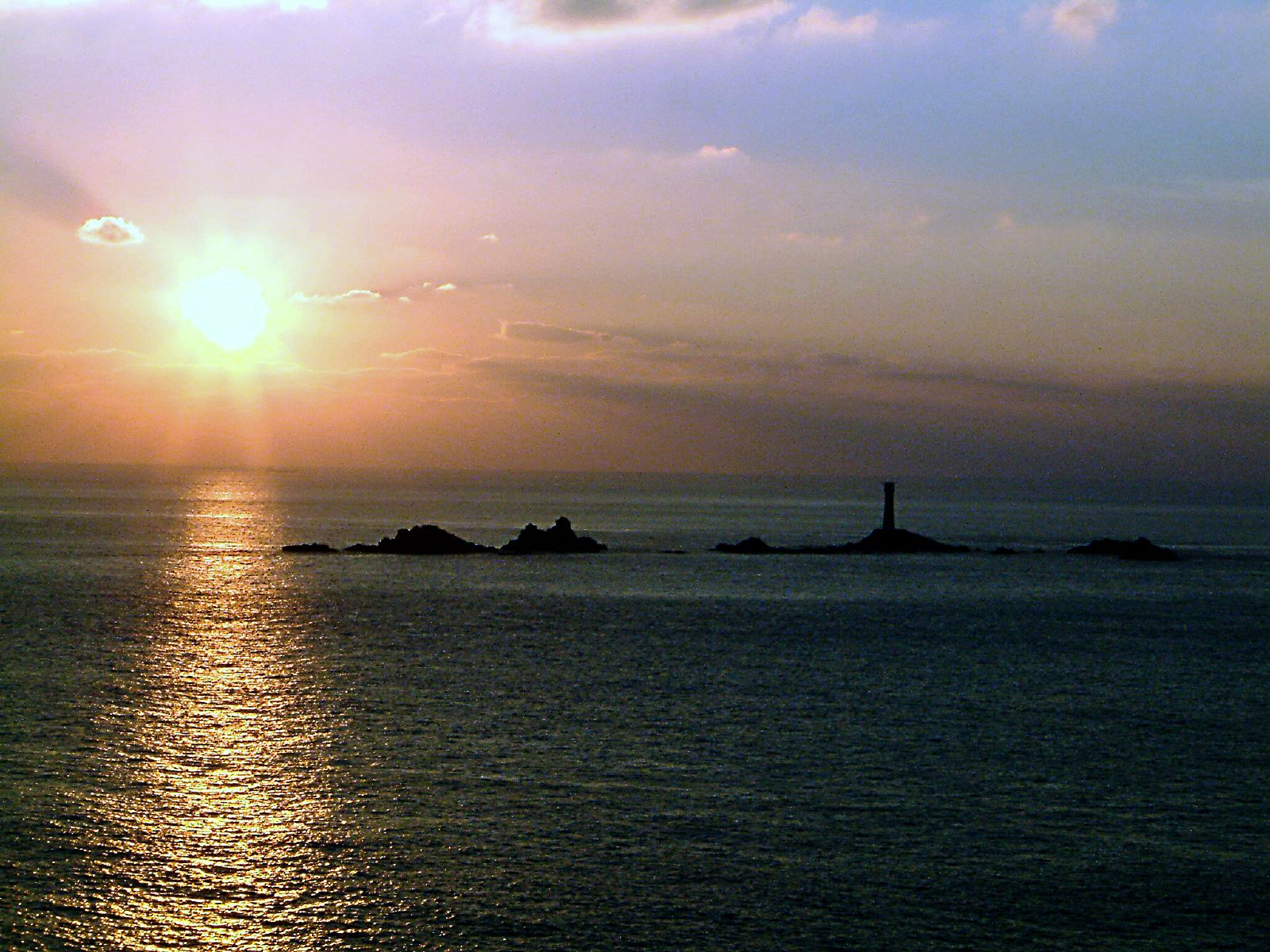
- A view of the Longships from the mainland

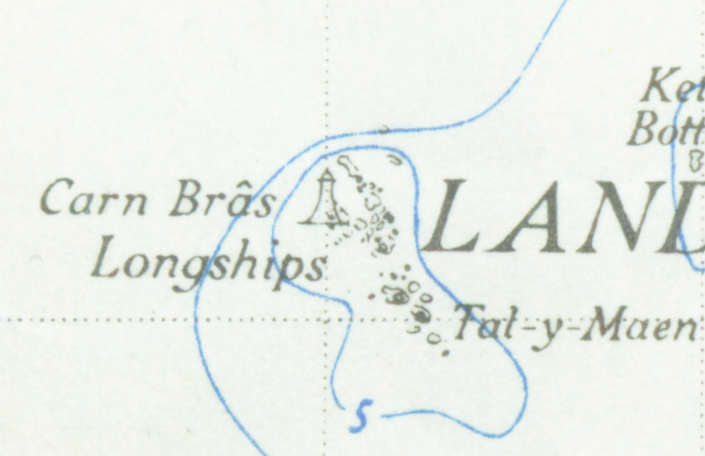
- A 1946 map of Longships

- Location within Cornwall

Geography
- Location: Cornwall, UK
- Coordinates: 50.0661°N 5.7458°W

The Longships (Cornish: Gorholyon) is the name given to a group of rocky islets situated approximately 1 1/4 miles (2 km) west of Land's End, Cornwall, England, United Kingdom. The islets are marked by the Longships Lighthouse, the current structure being first lit in December 1873. The islets are very popular for recreational diving, the sea has clear water with prolific marine life and flora.

== Geography ==
The Longships lie off the granite headland of Land's End and the contact area between the granite pluton and the "country rocks" is just offshore. The reef is within a metamorphic aureole formed after the granite intruded the earlier Devonian rocks between 268 and 275 million years ago, during the Permian period. Much of the Longship group is submerged at high water but the three largest islets in the group – Tal-y-Maen, Carn Brâs, and Meinek – remain above the high water mark. Two smaller rocks known as Kettle's Bottom are situated midway between Longship and the coast. The Longships islets (but not Kettle's Bottom rocks) are in the civil parish of Sennen.

=== Names of the rocks ===
The names of the rocks that make up the reef have meanings in the Cornish language.

- Cein (Cornish: Keyn, meaning back, ridge, or keel)
- Farkell Carn (Cornish: Karn Forghel, meaning forked cairn)
- Tal-y-maen (Cornish: Tal an Meyn, meaning brow of the stones)
- Carn Brâs (Cornish: Karn Bras, meaning big cairn)
- Herly (Cornish: Hir Legh, meaning long ledge)
- Plassek (Cornish: Plosek, meaning dirty place)
- Meinek (Cornish: Meynek, meaning stony place)

== Shipwrecks ==
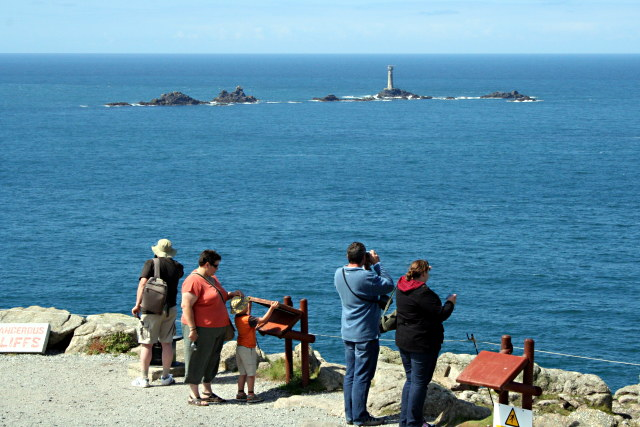
A view of the Longships from the mainland

It is not known how many ships have been lost in and around Land's End but there are hundreds recorded and probably thousands unknown. One of the earliest recorded on the Longships, is an unidentified ship lost at the Long Shipps in 1532 reported by the bayliffe John Penheleg. Other wrecks include:

- 1898: S.S. Bluejacket,
- 1901, November: 'Mary James.' Built 1862 by Richard Tredwen in Padstow. For most of her life owned by the St. Just family of Harvey James and made many voyages to Wales with copper ore, bringing back coal for the mines. Sank after dismasting.

== Gallery ==
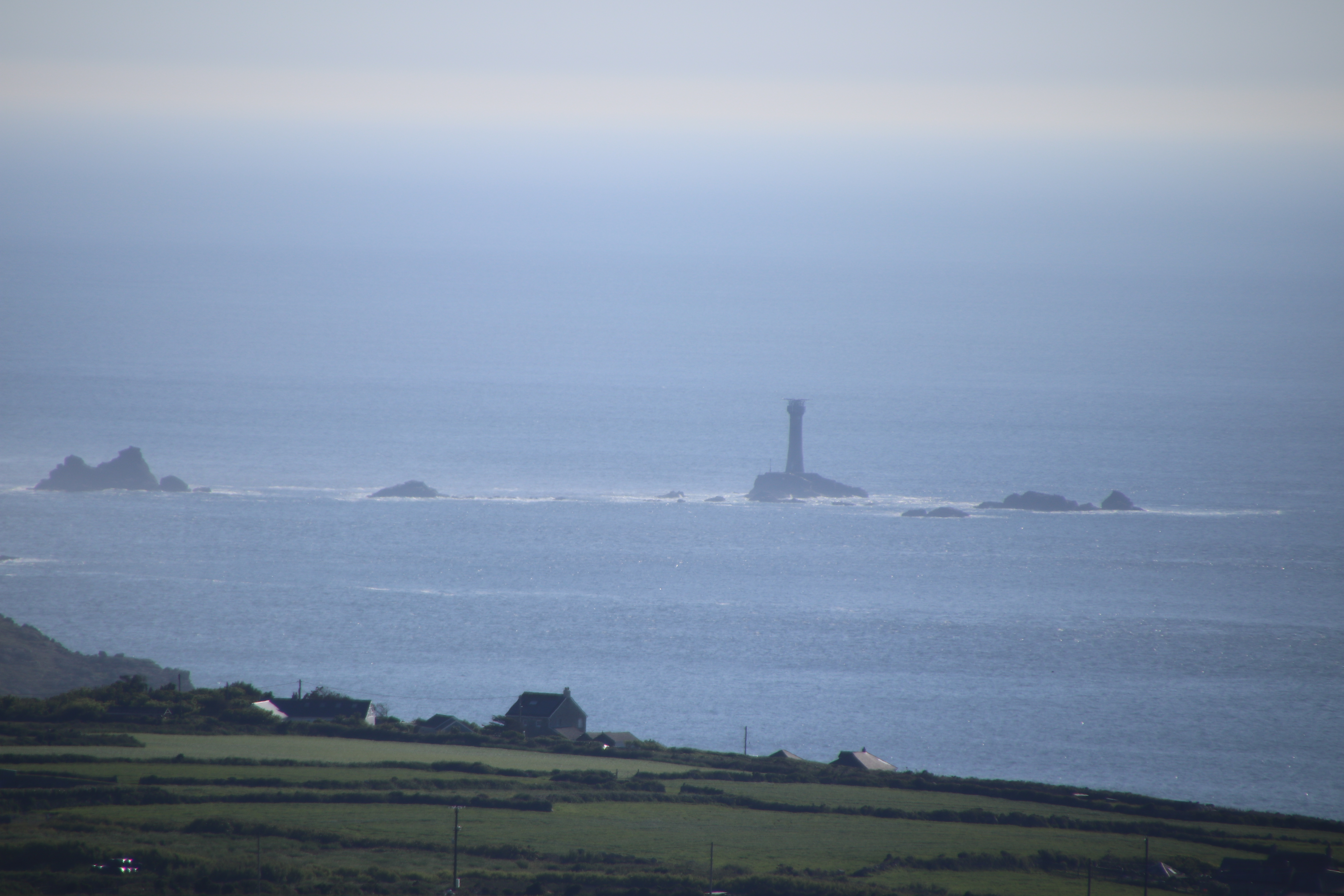
Longships Lighthouse in the distance

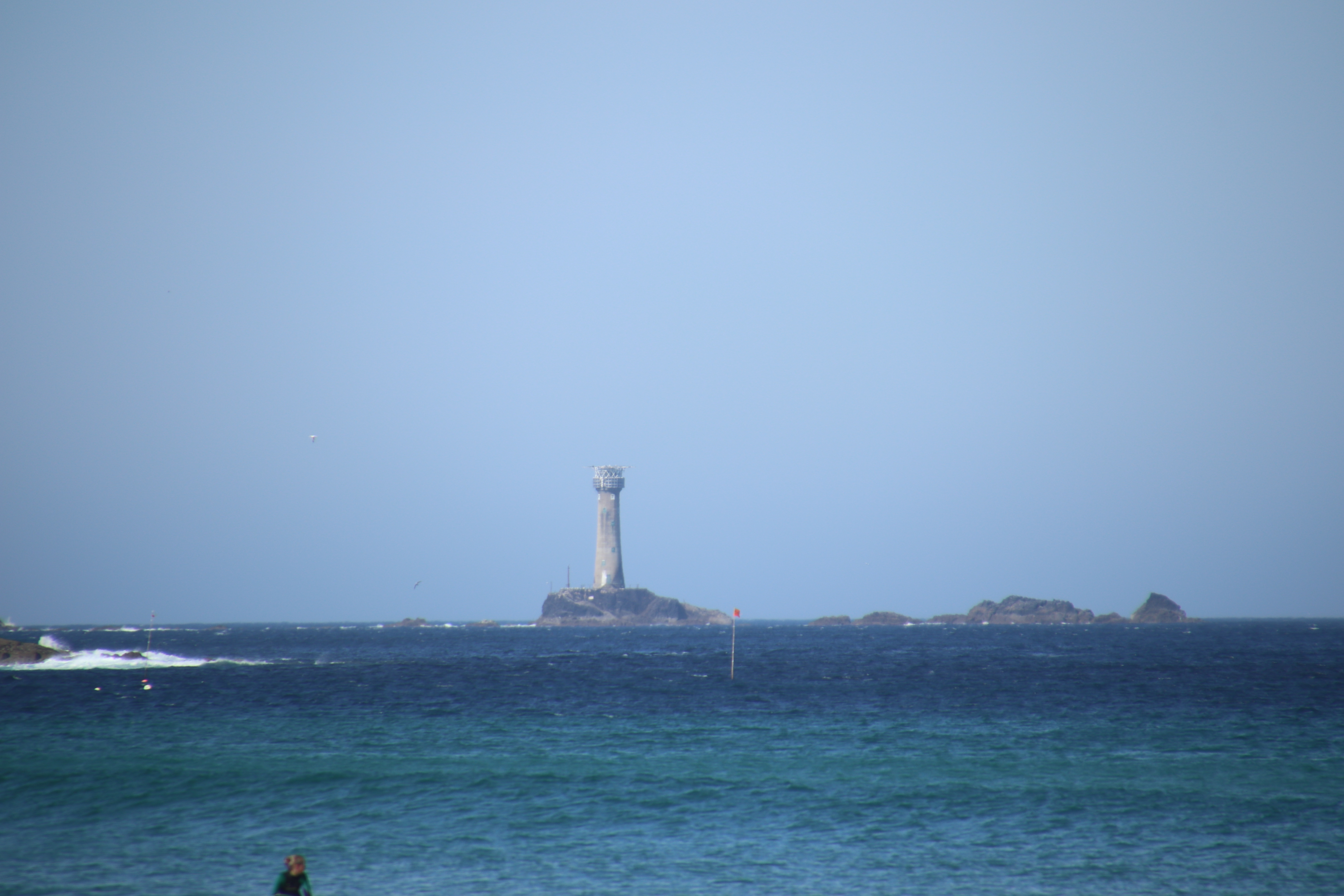
Longships Lighthouse
