= The Norman Archipelago =

Painting by John Brett

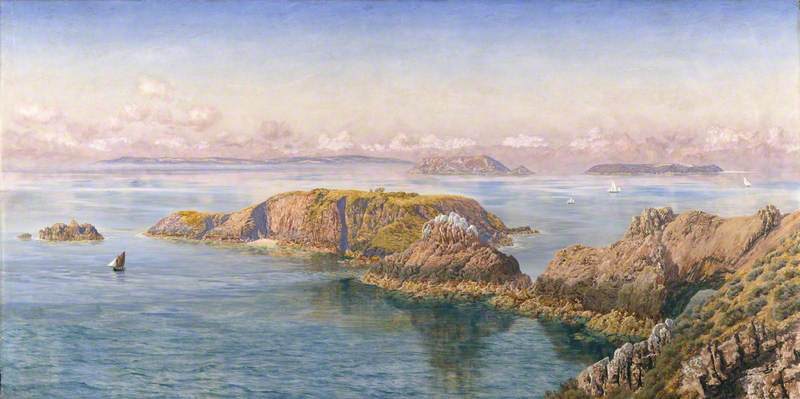
- Artist: John Brett
- Year: 1885
- Type: Oil on canvas, landscape painting
- Dimensions: 107.2 cm × 214 cm (42.2 in × 84 in)
- Location: Manchester Art Gallery, Greater Manchester

The Norman Archipelago is an oil painting on canvas by the British artist John Brett, from 1885.

A seascape, it features a panoramic view of the Channel Islands, looking across from Sark, towards Guernsey, Herm and Jethou. The title references the fact that they are part of the Duchy of Normandy.

Brett had been strongly influenced by the pre-Raphaelite movement of the mid-Victorian era and his landscape paintings reflected this. The painting was displayed at the Royal Academy Exhibition of 1885 held at Burlington House, in London. The picture is now in the collection of Manchester Art Gallery, having been acquired that same year.

== Bibliography ==
- Payne, Christiana. John Brett: Pre-Raphaelite Landscape Painter. Yale University Press, 2010.
- Treuherz, Julian. Pre-Raphaelite Paintings from Manchester City Art Galleries. Manchester City Art Gallery, 1993.
