= Lady with a Dove =

Painting by John Brett

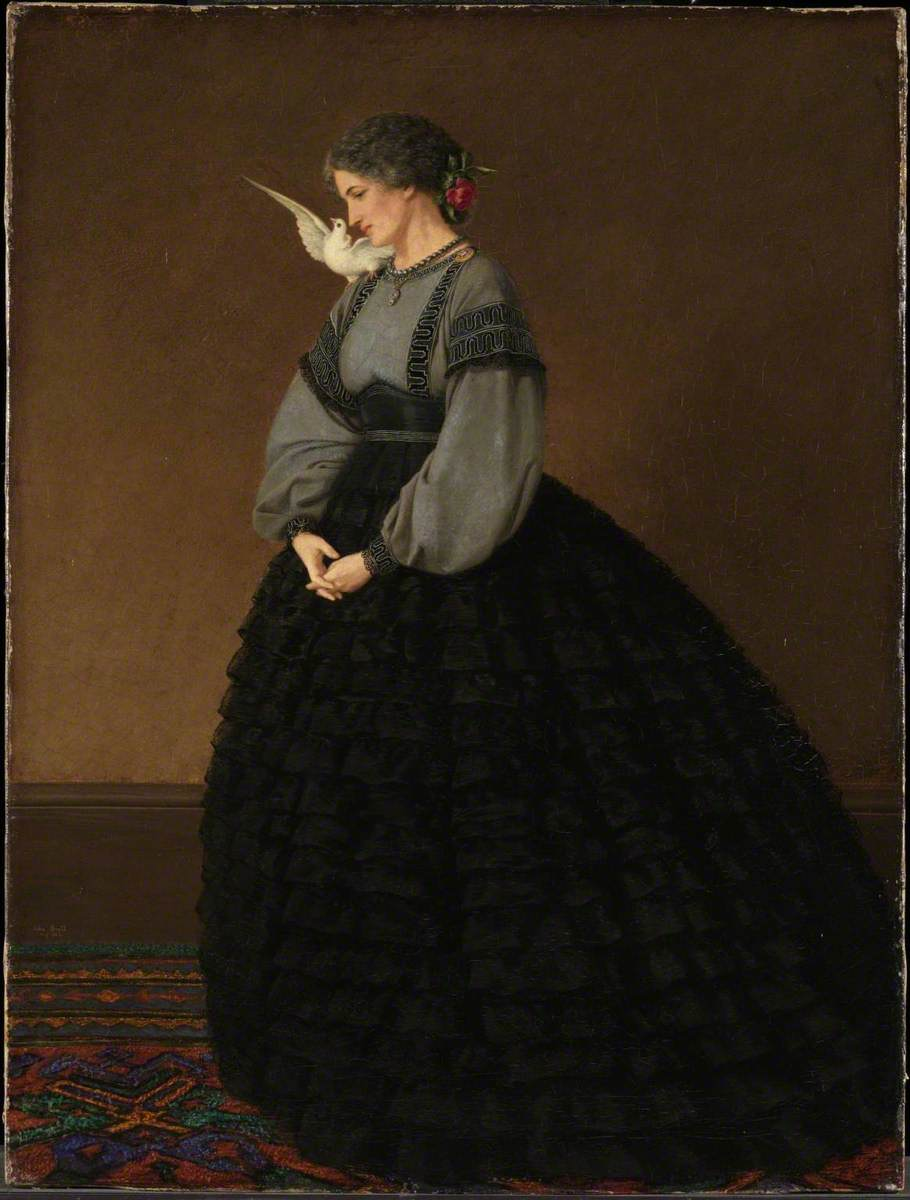
- Artist: John Brett
- Year: 1864
- Type: Oil on canvas, portrait painting
- Dimensions: 45.7 cm × 61 cm (18.0 in × 24 in)
- Location: Tate Britain, London

Lady with a Dove is an oil on canvas portrait painting by the British artist John Brett, from 1864.

== History and description ==
It depicts Jeannette Loeser, a member of the British community in Florence, who he met during his time in Italy. She is shown with a dove perched on her shoulder. Brett was a painter associated with the Pre-Raphaelite Brotherhood and best known for his landscape paintings.

The painting was by some reports commissioned by the sitters husband Frederick Loeser. However it was listed for sale when or exhibited at the Royal Manchester Institution in 1865. Today the picture is in the collection of the Tate Britain in London, having been acquired in 1919.

== Bibliography ==
- Casteras, Susan. Images of Victorian Womanhood in English Art. Fairleigh Dickinson University Press, 1987.
- DelPlato, Joan. Multiple Wives, Multiple Pleasures: Representing the Harem, 1800-1875. Fairleigh Dickinson University Press, 2002.
- Payne, Christiana. John Brett: Pre-Raphaelite Landscape Painter. Yale University Press, 2010.
