= Florence from Bellosguardo =

Painting by John Brett

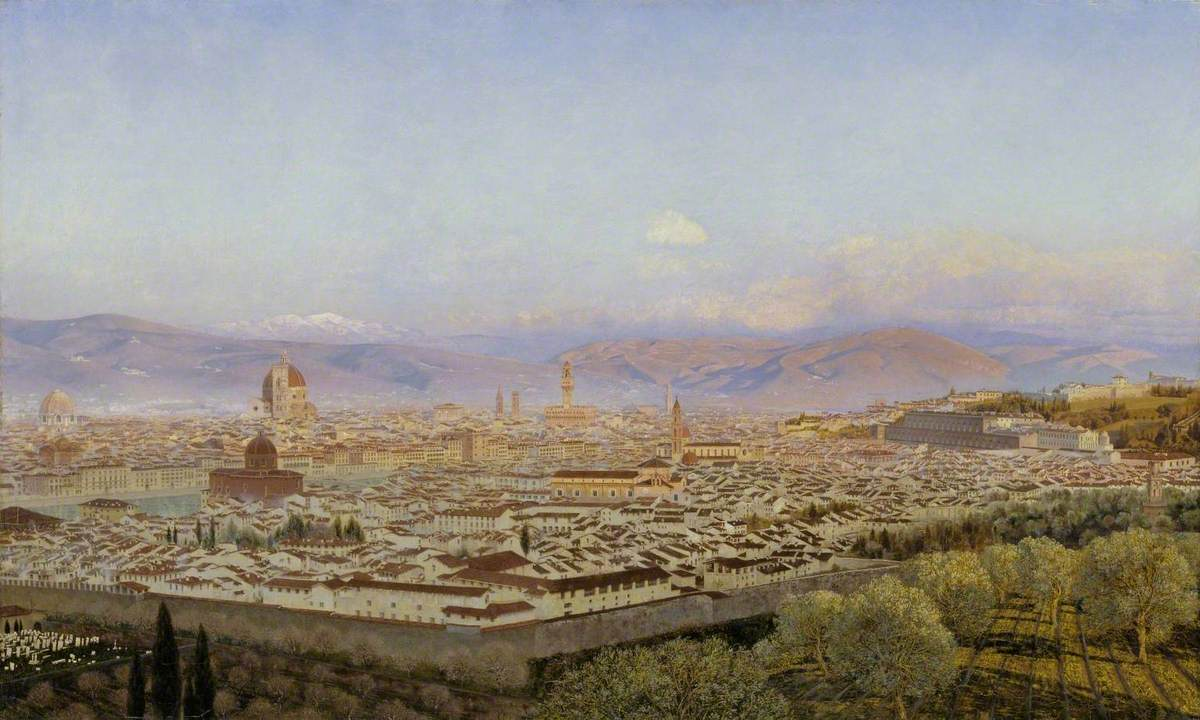
- Artist: John Brett
- Year: 1863
- Type: Oil on canvas, landscape painting
- Dimensions: 60 cm × 101.3 cm (24 in × 39.9 in)
- Location: Tate Britain, London

Florence from Bellosguardo is an oil on canvas landscape painting by the British artist John Brett, from 1863. It is held at the Tate Britain, in London.

== History and description ==
It features a panoramic view of the Italian city of Florence in Tuscany, seen from the hill at Bellosguardo. Brett, associated with the Pre-Raphaelite Brotherhood, had visited the city for two extended visits in the past couple of years. He may have been inspired by lines in the poems of Robert Browning and his wife Elizabeth Barrett Browning, who both wrote about the view from Bellosguardo.

Brett submitted the painting to the Royal Academy Exhibition of 1863 being held in the National Gallery in London, but it was rejected by the hanging committee. Today it is in the collection of the Tate Britain, which acquired it in 1972.

== Bibliography ==
- Staley, Allen & Newall, Christopher. Pre-Raphaelite Vision: Truth to Nature. Harry N. Abrams, 2004.
- Payne, Christiana. John Brett: Pre-Raphaelite Landscape Painter. Yale University Press, 2010.
