= John Brett (artist) =

British painter (1831–1902)

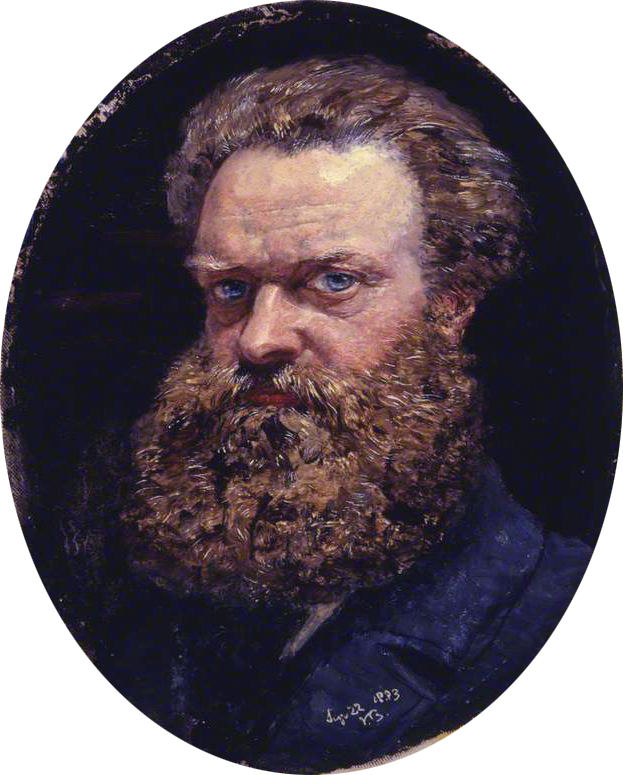
Self-Portrait (1883)

John Brett ARA (8 December 1831 – 7 January 1902) was a British artist associated with the Pre-Raphaelite movement, mainly notable for his highly detailed landscapes.

== Life ==
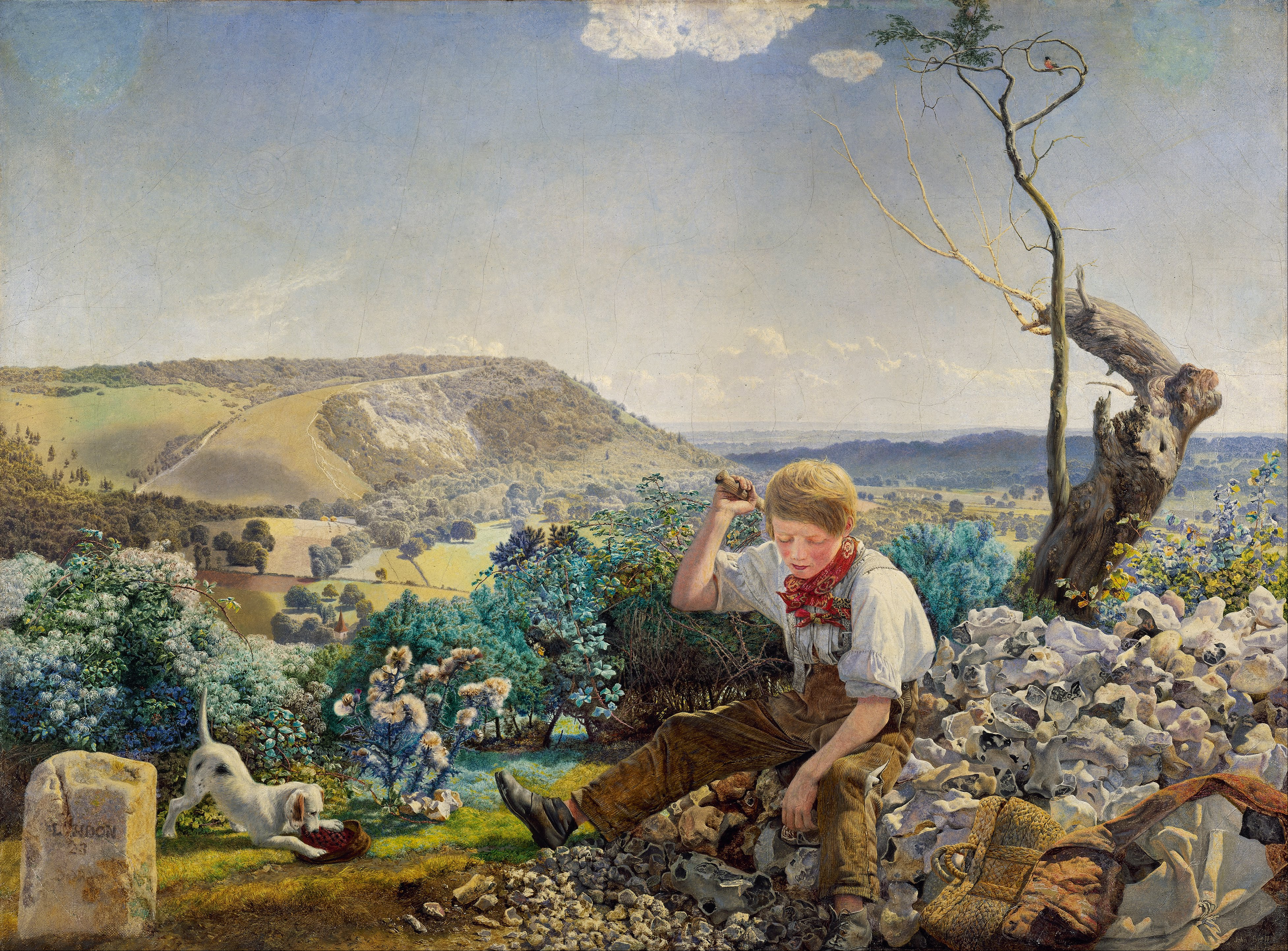
The Stonebreaker, 1858.

Brett was born near Reigate on 8 December 1831, the son of an army vet. His sister Rosa Brett was also an artist and during 1850 and 1851 they shared a studio. In 1851 he began lessons in art with James Duffield Harding, a landscape painter. He also studied with Richard Redgrave. In 1853 he entered the Royal Academy Schools, but was more interested in the ideas of John Ruskin and William Holman Hunt, whom he met through his friend the poet Coventry Patmore. Inspired by Hunt's ideal of scientific landscape painting, Brett visited Switzerland, where he worked on topographical landscapes and came under the further influence of John William Inchbold.

In 1858 Brett exhibited The Stonebreaker, the painting that made his reputation. This depicted a youth smashing stones to create a road-surface, sitting in a brightly lit and brilliantly detailed landscape. (The treatment provided a strong contrast with Henry Wallis's painting of the same name, exhibited the same year.) The precision of the geological and botanical detail in Brett's version greatly impressed Ruskin, who praised the painting highly, predicting that Brett would be able to paint a masterpiece if he were to visit the Val d'Aosta in Italy. Partly funded by Ruskin, Brett made the trip to paint the location, exhibiting it in 1859, again to high praise from Ruskin, who bought the painting. Other critics were less effusive, one describing it as a "gravestone for post-Ruskinism".

Brett continued to paint carefully detailed landscape views, staying in Italy on many occasions in the 1860s. He was always keen to stress the scientific precision of his rendering of nature, but often infused it with moral and religious significance, as recommended by Ruskin. In his later years he painted more coastal subjects and seascapes, subjects he came to know well due to his ownership of a 210-ton schooner, Viking (which had a crew of twelve), on which he travelled the Mediterranean.

During summers in the 1880s Brett rented the castle at Newport, Pembrokeshire to use as a base for his large family while he painted, sketched and photographed the south and west coasts of Wales. An exhibition in 2001 at the National Museum of Wales, Cardiff, entitled John Brett - a Pre-Raphaelite on the Shores of Wales brought together many of the major works from this period of his career.

Brett was also a keen astronomer, having studied the subject from childhood. He was elected a Fellow of the Royal Astronomical Society in 1871. Brett was a founder member of the Art Workers' Guild and elected Master in 1890.

== Gallery ==
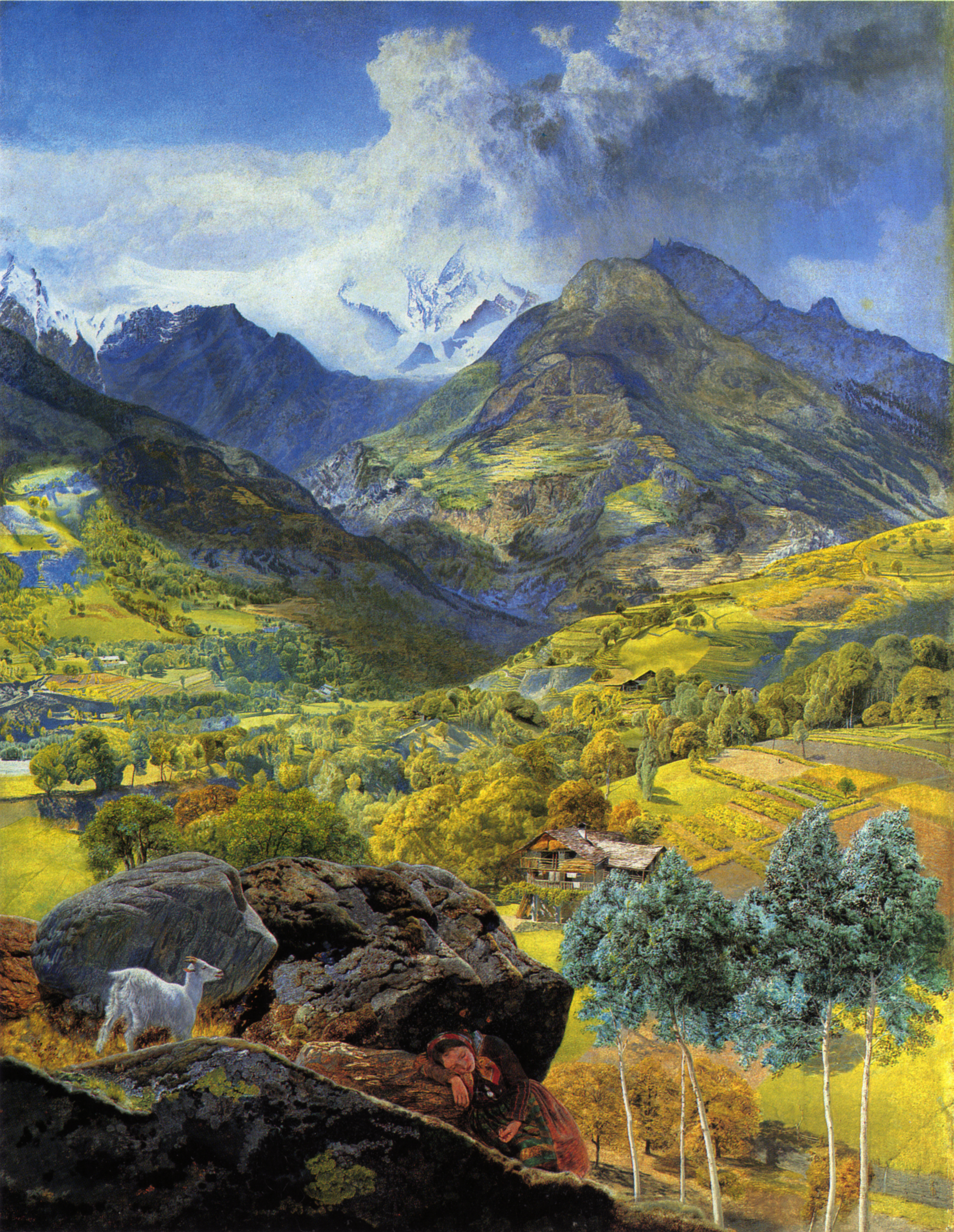
The Val d'Aosta, 1858

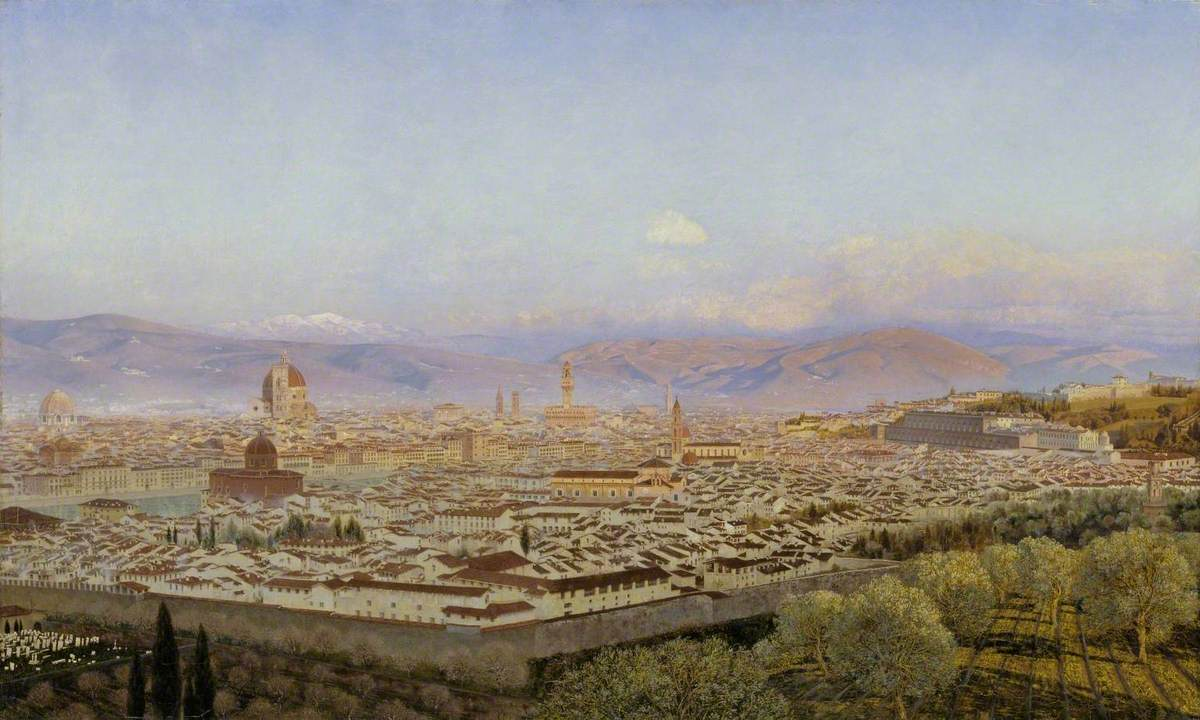
Florence from Bellosguardo, 1863

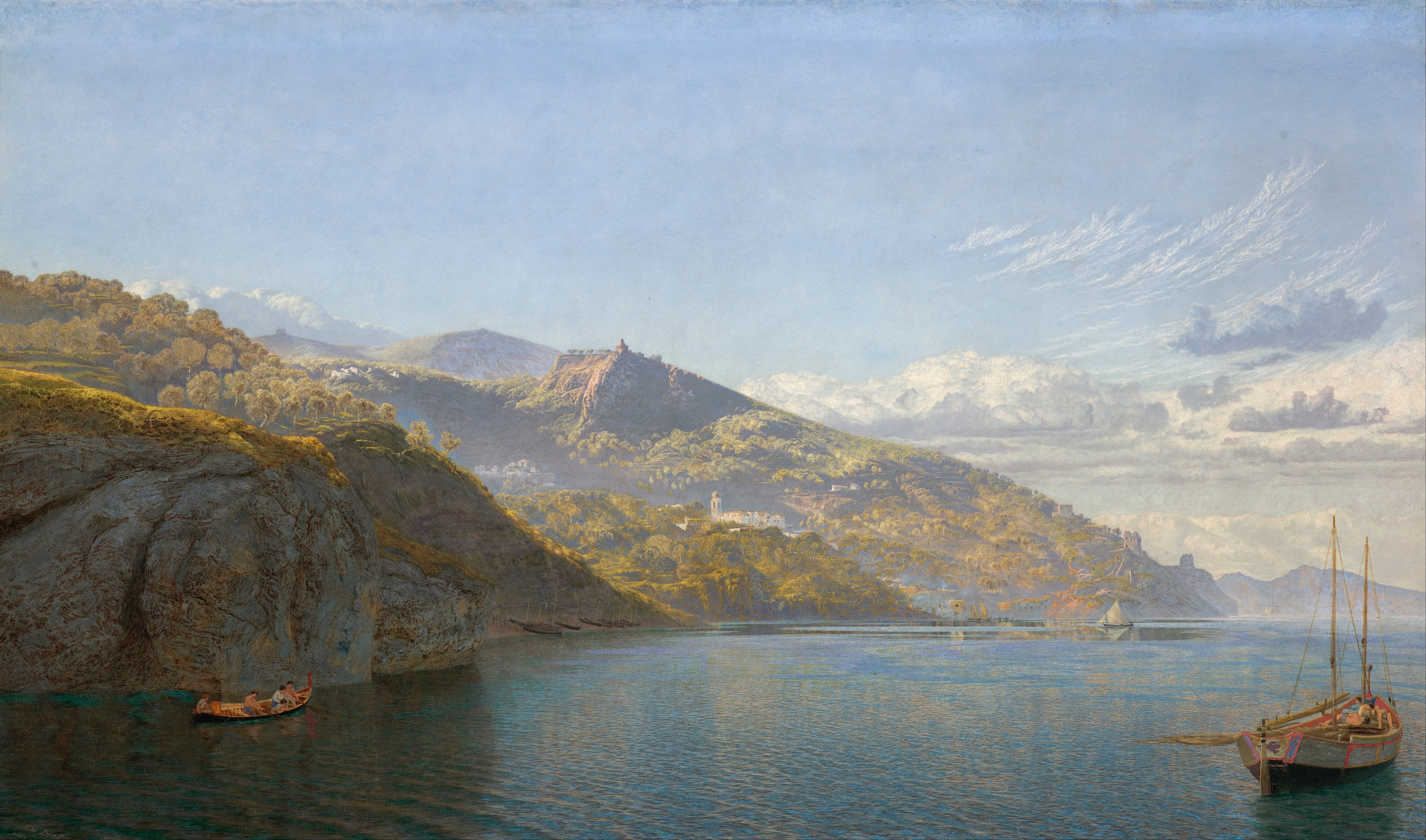
Massa, Bay of Naples, 1864

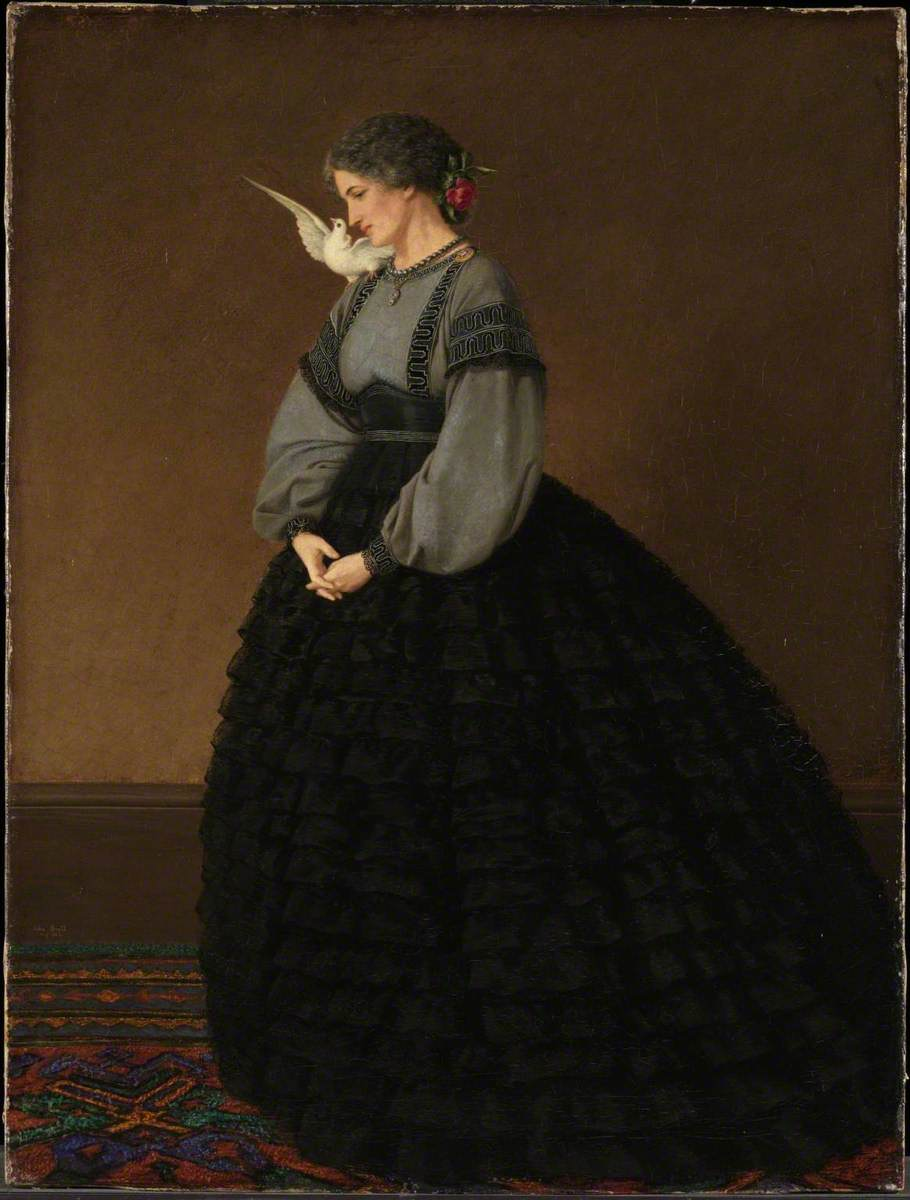
Lady with a Dove, 1864

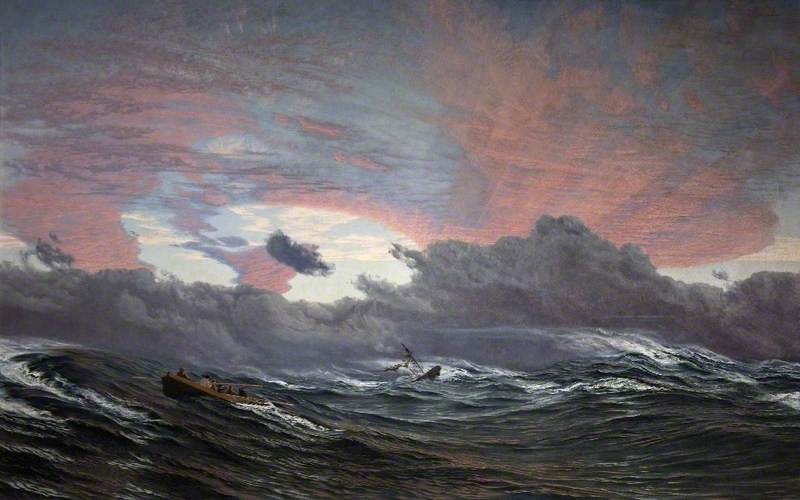
Christmas Morning, 1866, 1868

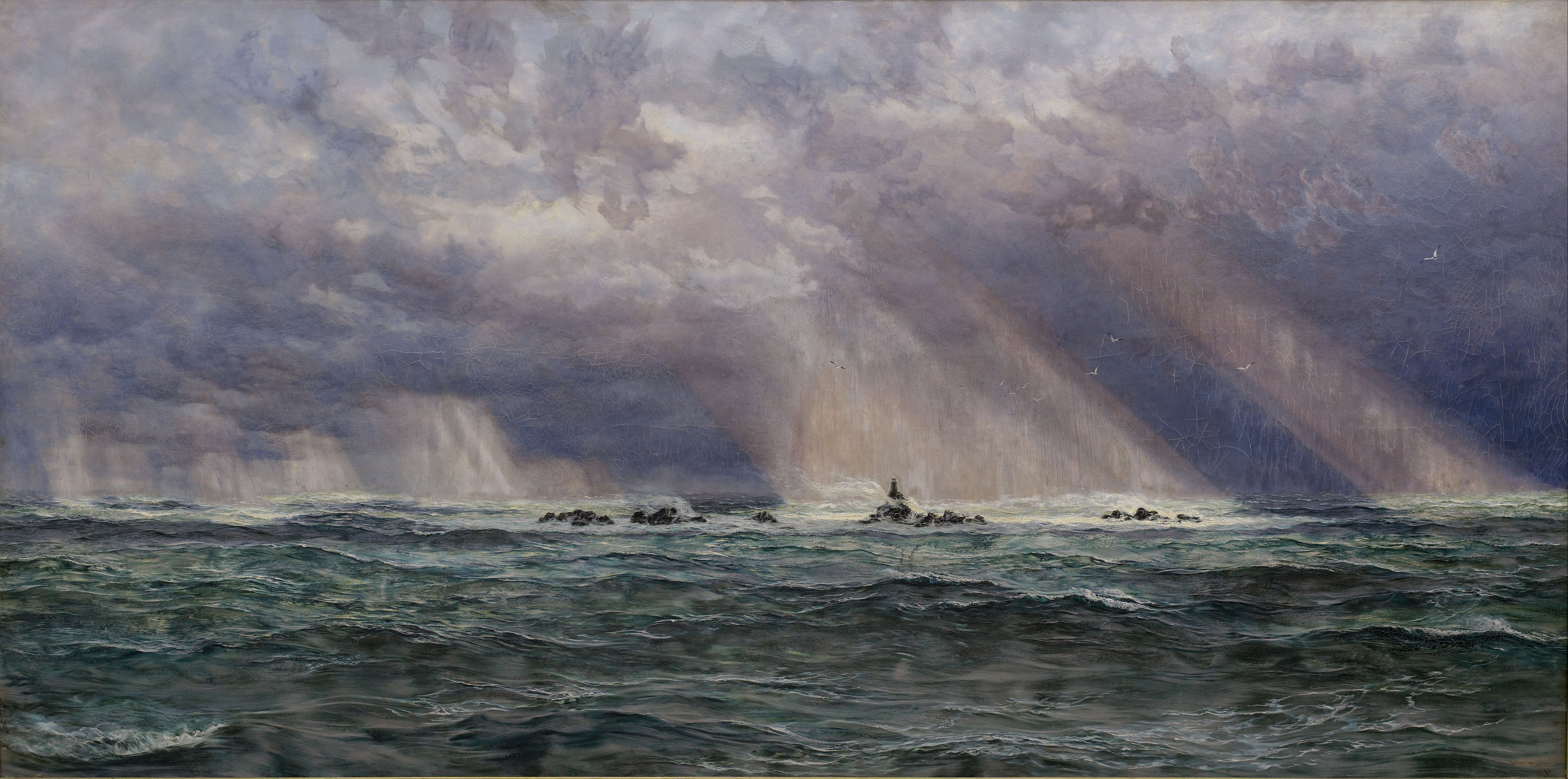
A North-West Gale off the Longships Lighthouse, 1873

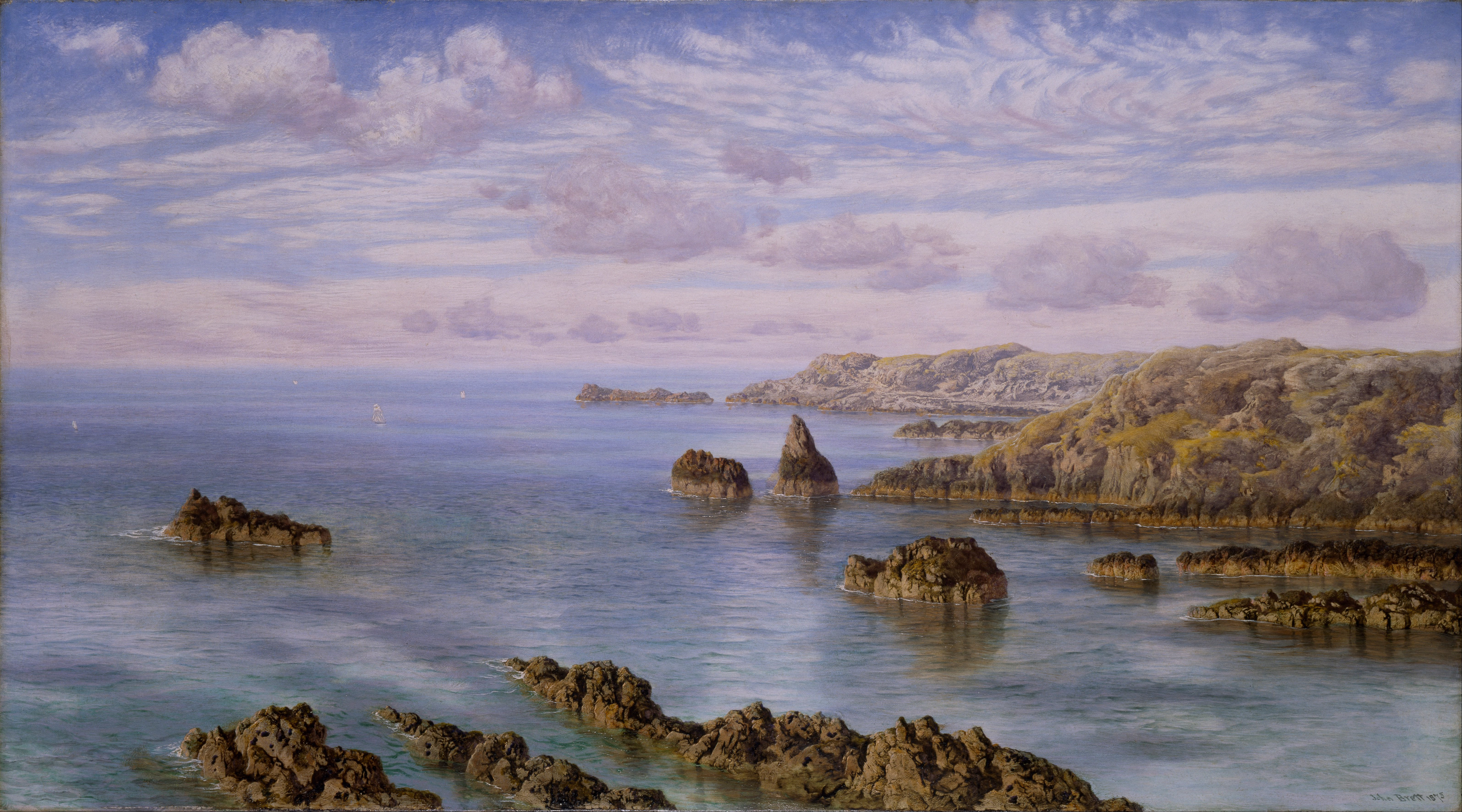
Southern Coast of Guernsey, 1875

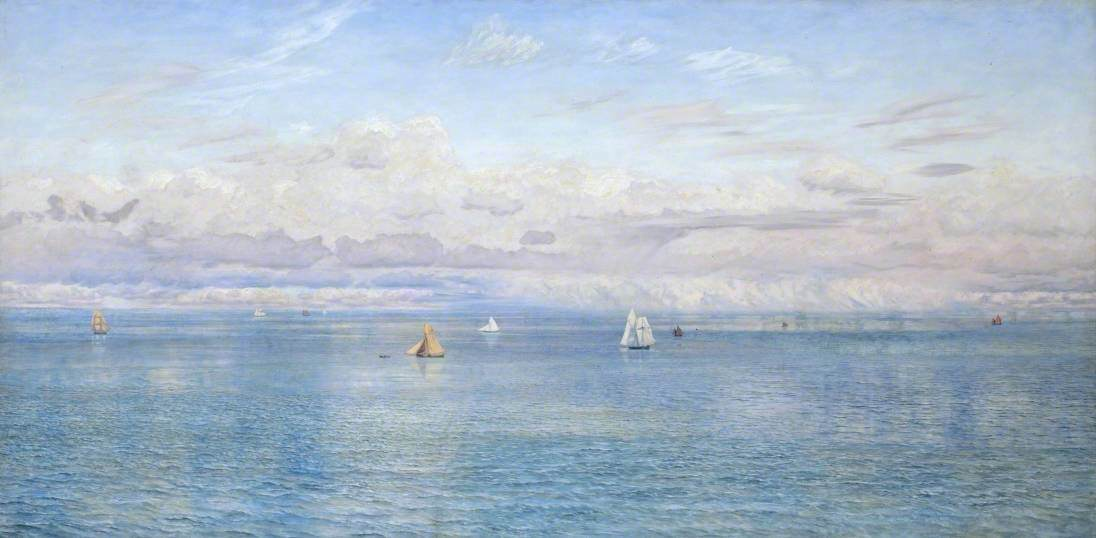
Britannia's Realm, 1880

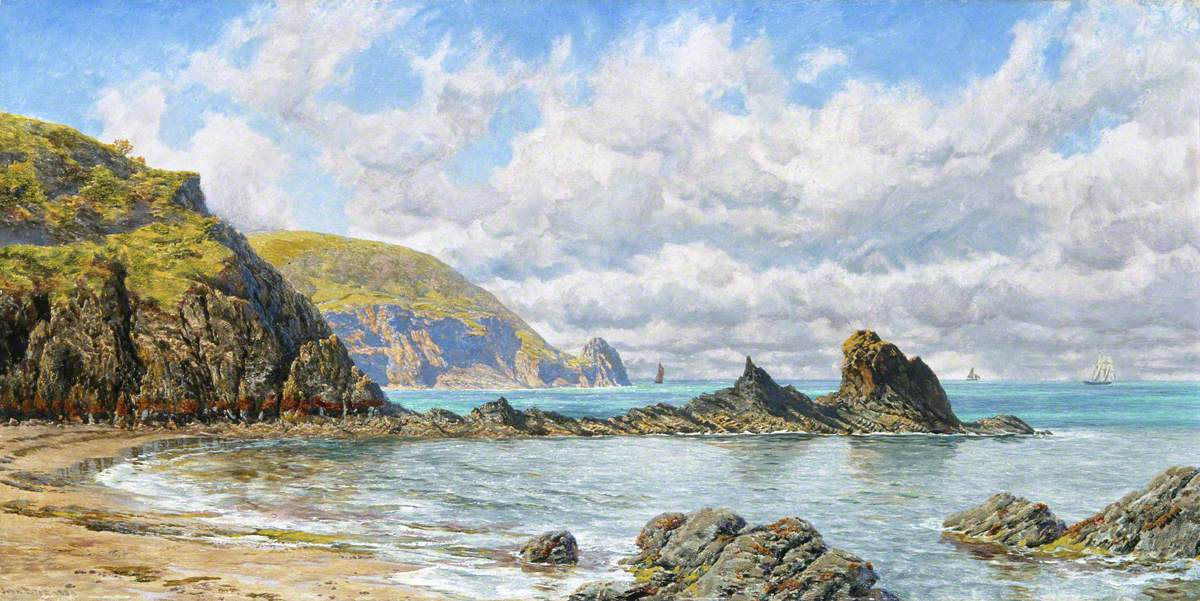
Forest Cove, Cardigan Bay, 1883

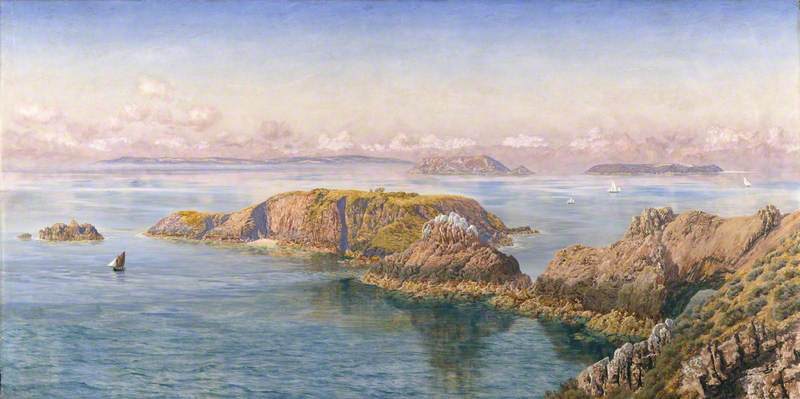
The Norman Archipelago, 1885

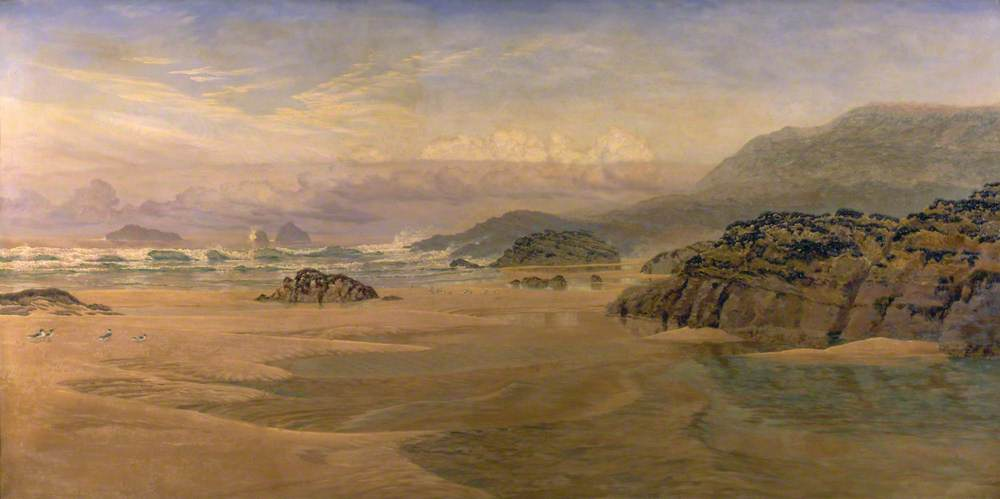
Echoes of a Far-Off Storm, 1890

== See also ==
- List of Pre-Raphaelite paintings - including the works of John Brett.
- The Stonebreaker - Henry Wallis' painting on the same theme as Brett's.

== Sources ==
- Armstrong, Walter (1912). "Brett, John" . In Lee, Sidney (ed.). Dictionary of National Biography (2nd supplement). London: Smith, Elder & Co.
- Bridgman, Roger. "Brett, John Watkins (1805–1863)". Oxford Dictionary of National Biography (online ed.). Oxford University Press. doi:10.1093/ref:odnb/3345. (Subscription, Wikipedia Library access or UK public library membership required.)
