= The Death of Tiberius =

Painting by Jean-Paul Laurens

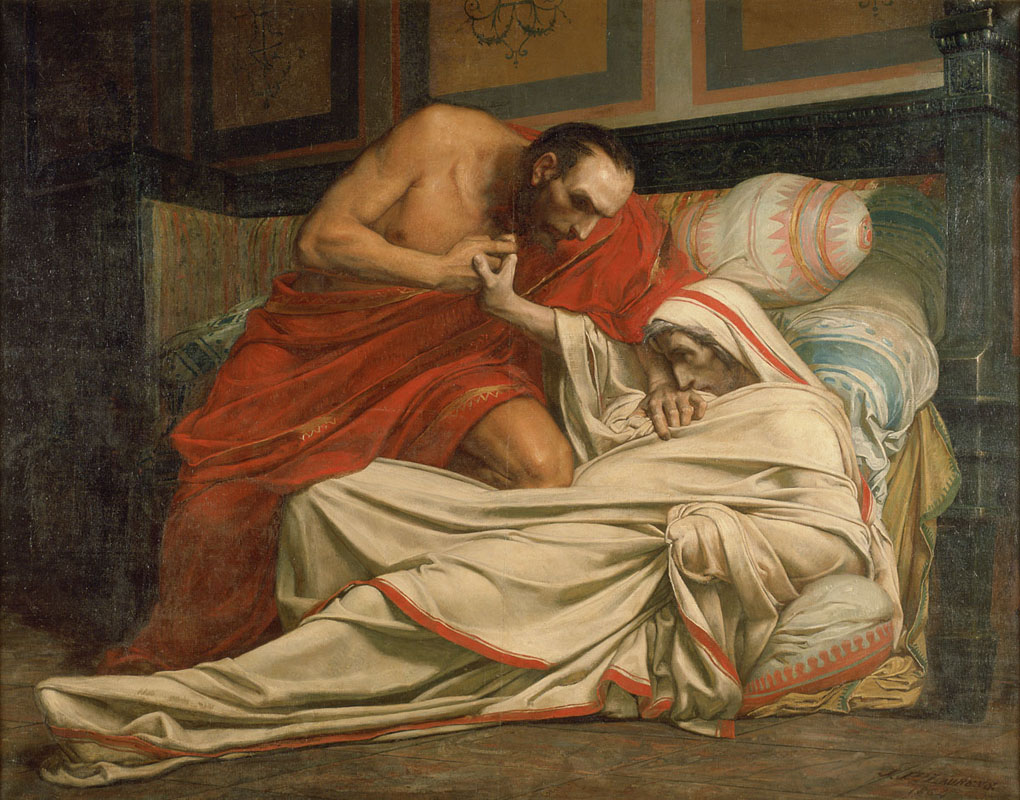
- Artist: Jean-Paul Laurens
- Year: 1864
- Type: Oil on canvas, history painting
- Dimensions: 177 cm × 223 cm (70 in × 88 in)
- Location: Georges Labit Museum; Toulouse

The Death of Tiberius (French: La Mort de Tibère) is an 1864 history painting by the French artist Jean-Paul Laurens. It depicts a dramatic version of the death of Tiberius, the Roman Emperor. The elderly Tiberius is murdered by his nephew Caligula, who is shown taking the imperial signet ring. Laurens had a low opinion of the character of Tiberius, whose death contrasts with the heroic suicide of Cato the Younger depicted in a painting he had exhibited at the Salon of 1863.

The painting was displayed at the Salon of 1864 held at the Palace of Industry in Paris. Today it is in the collection of the Georges Labit Museum in Toulouse.

== Bibliography ==
- Beard, Mary. Twelve Caesars: Images of Power from the Ancient World to the Modern. Princeton University Press, 2021.
- Fugelso, Karl. Politics and Medievalism. Boydell & Brewer, 2020.
