= Salon of 1864 =

1864 art exhibition in Paris

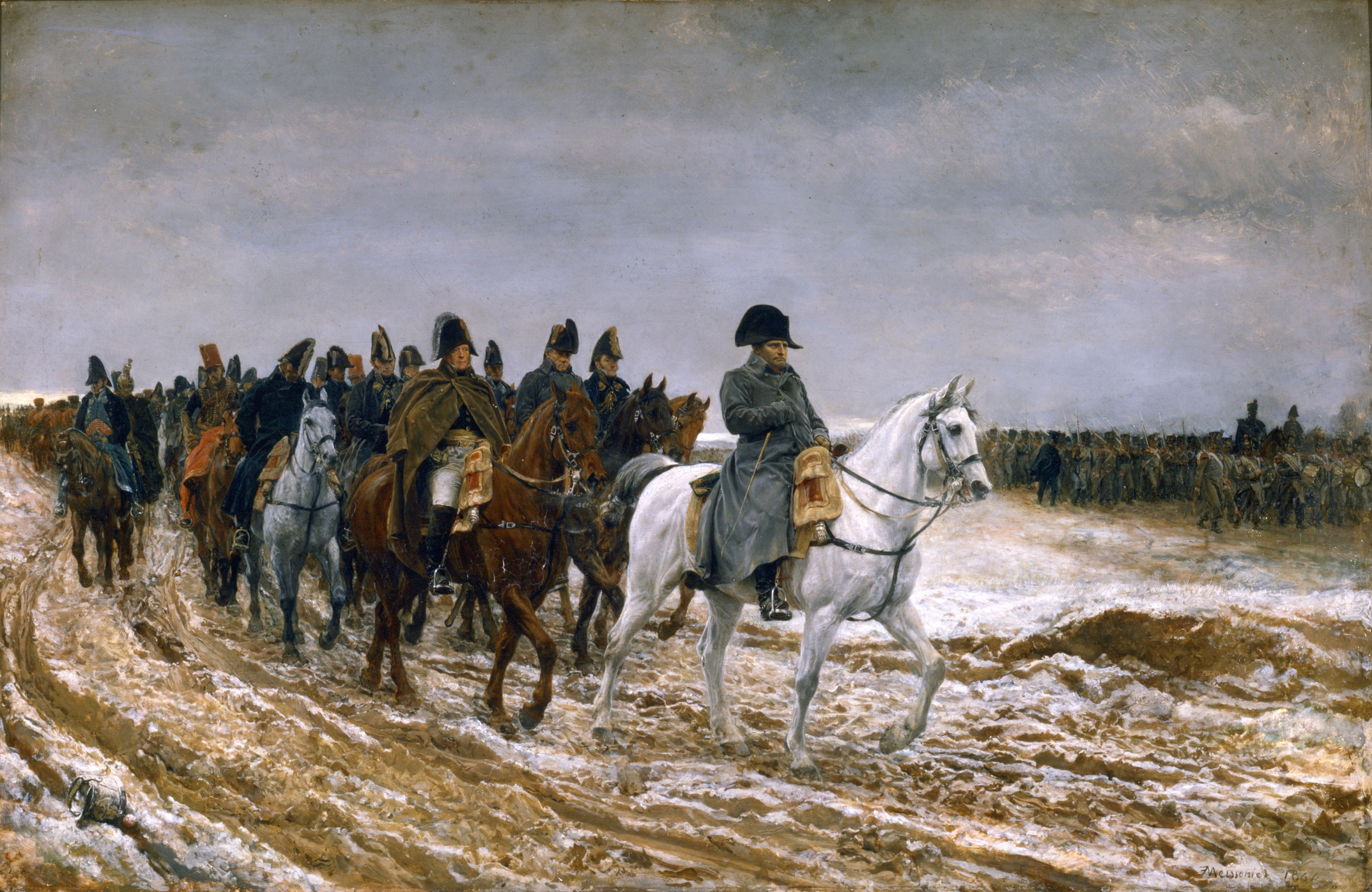
French Campaign, 1814 by Ernest Meissonier

The Salon of 1864 was an art exhibition held at the Palace of Industry in Paris. Organised by the Académie des Beaux-Arts, it opened on 1 May 1864. It featured submissions from leading artists, sculptors and architects of the Second Empire period.

Ernest Meissonier's French Campaign, 1814 features a scene from the Napoleonic Wars. He also submitted Napoleon III at the Battle of Solferino, depicting the French Emperor Napoleon III at the Battle of Solferino during the Second Italian War of Independence. The emperor purchased Jean-Baptiste-Camille Corot 's Souvenir de Mortefontaine for 3,000 Francs. James Tissot displayed two works Portrait of Mademoiselle L.L. and The Two Sisters, both featuring the same model. The latter drew attention as it was painted En plein air.

Pierre-Auguste Renoir made his Salon debut with Esmeralda, a painting based on Victor Hugo's The Hunchback of Notre-Dame, which he subsequently destroyed. Henri Fantin-Latour's Homage to Delacroix paid tribute to the late artist Eugène Delacroix, one of the major figures of the Romantic movement. Amongst other works on display were Oedipus and the Sphinx by Gustave Moreau and the history painting The Oath of Henri de Guise by Pierre-Charles Comte.

== Gallery ==
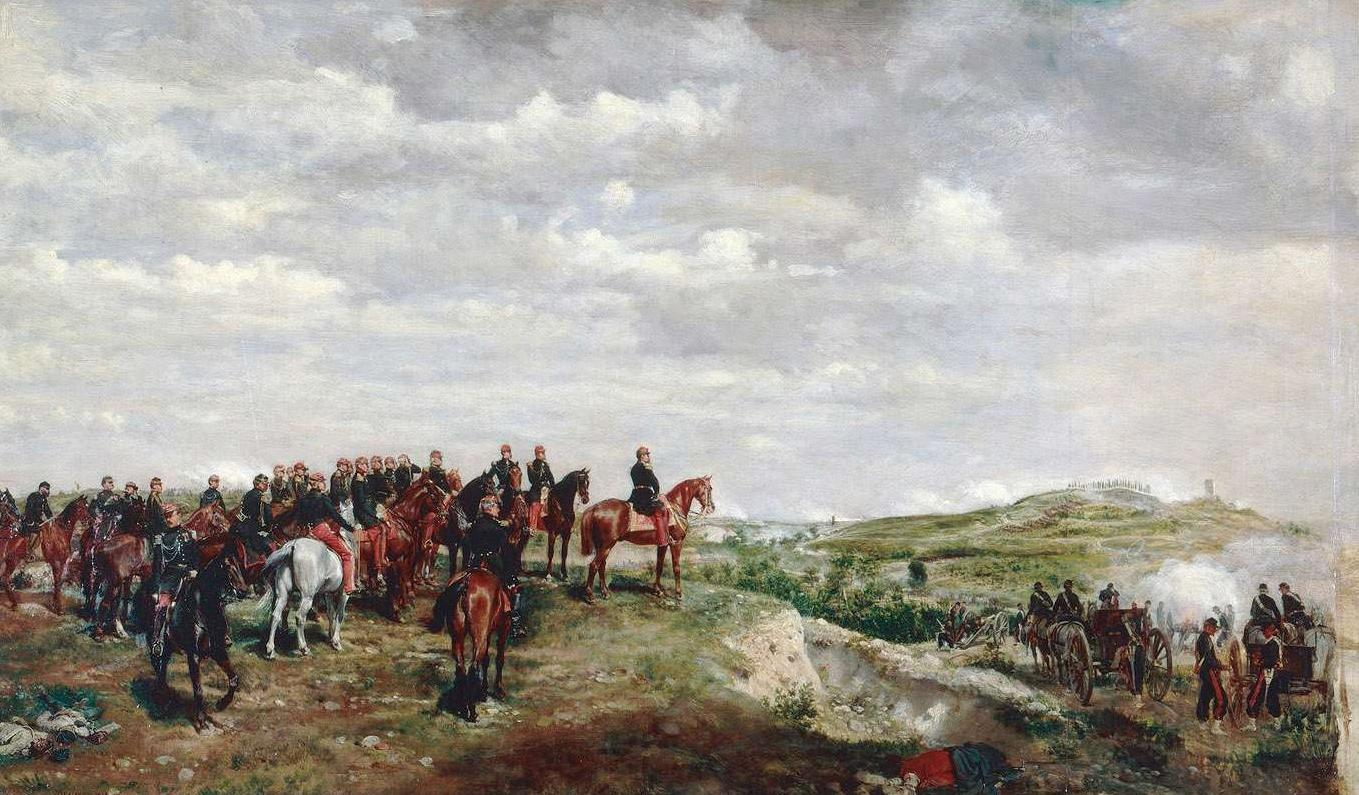
Napoleon III at the Battle of Solferino by Ernest Meissonier

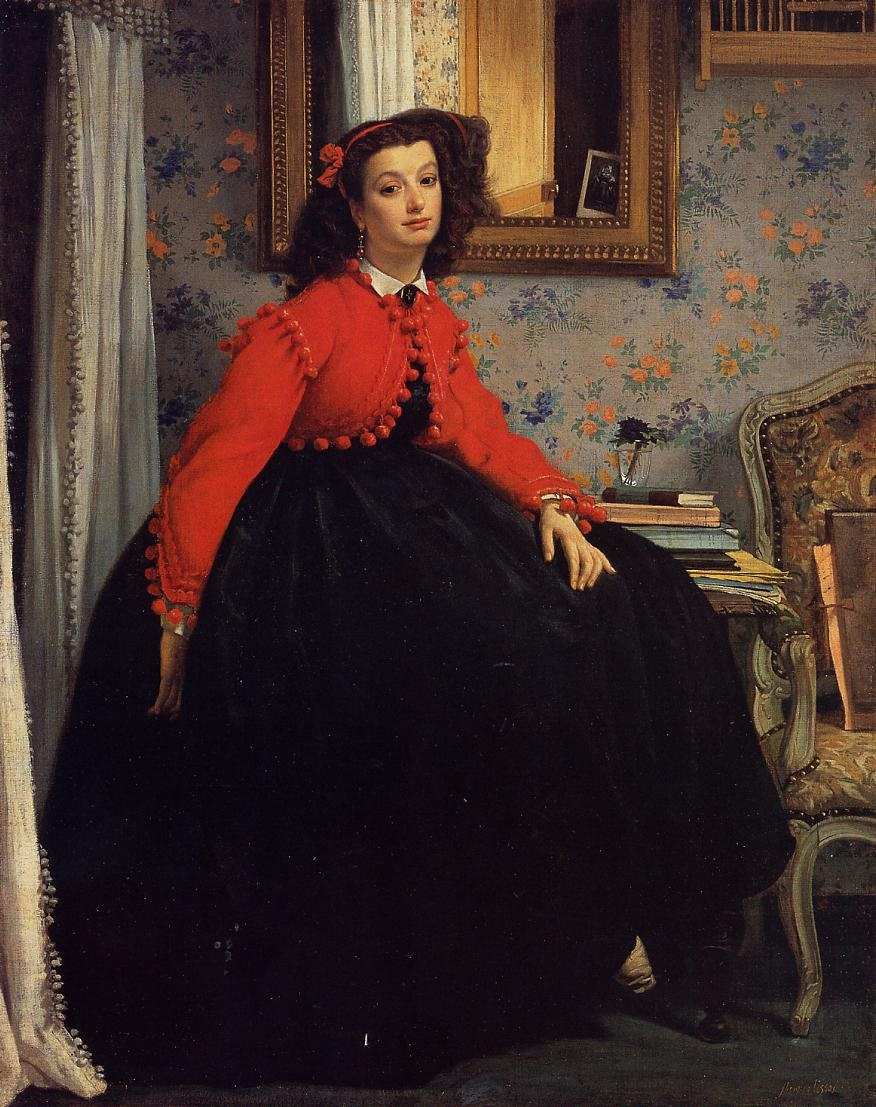
Portrait of Mademoiselle L.L. by James Tissot

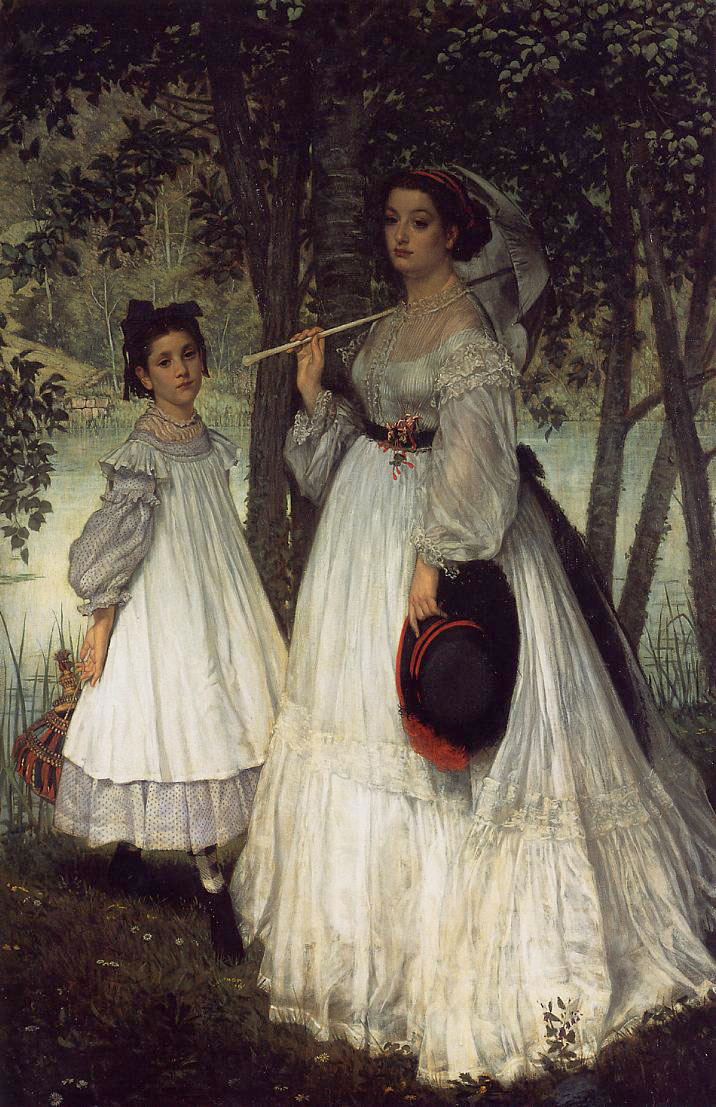
The Two Sisters by James Tissot

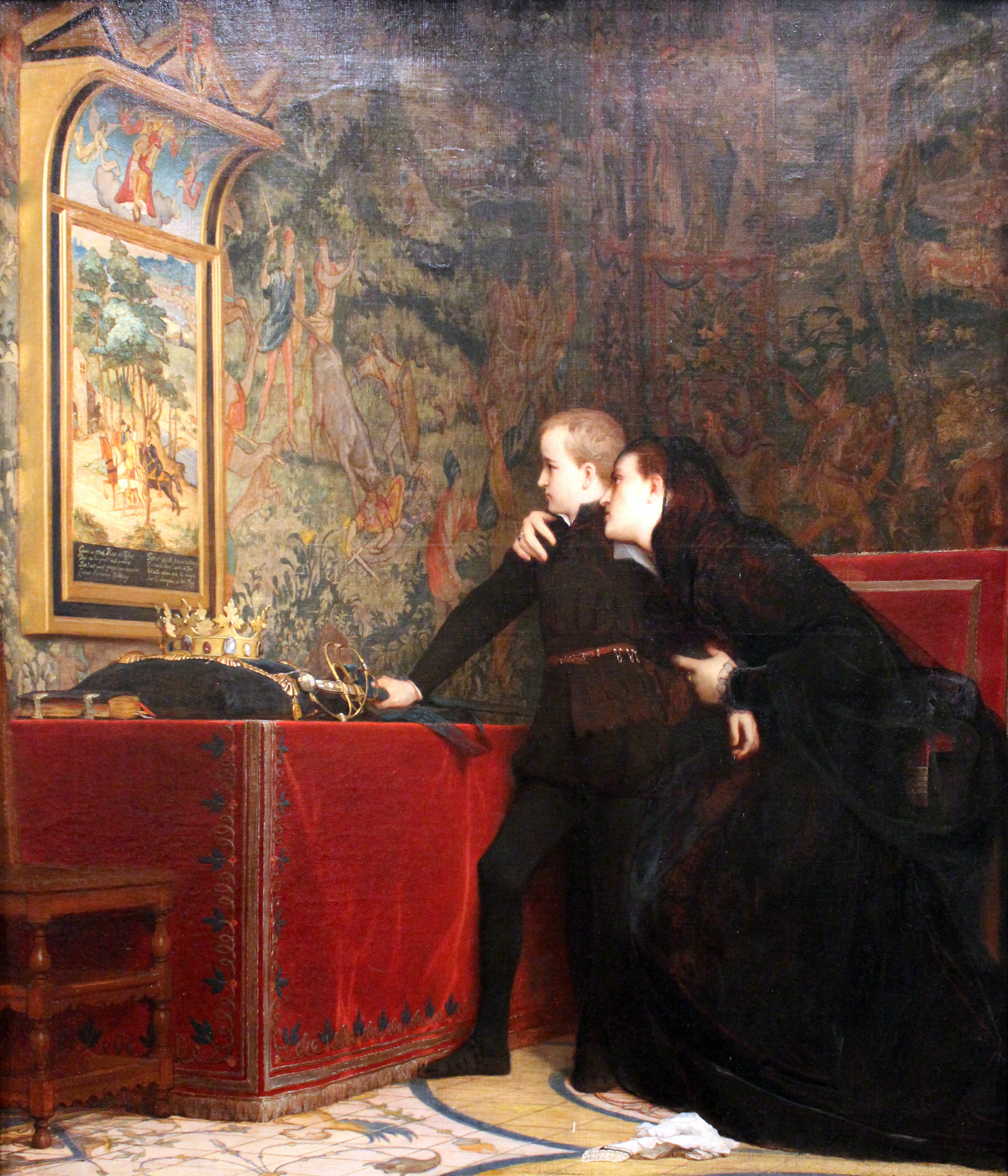
The Oath of Henri de Guise by Pierre-Charles Comte

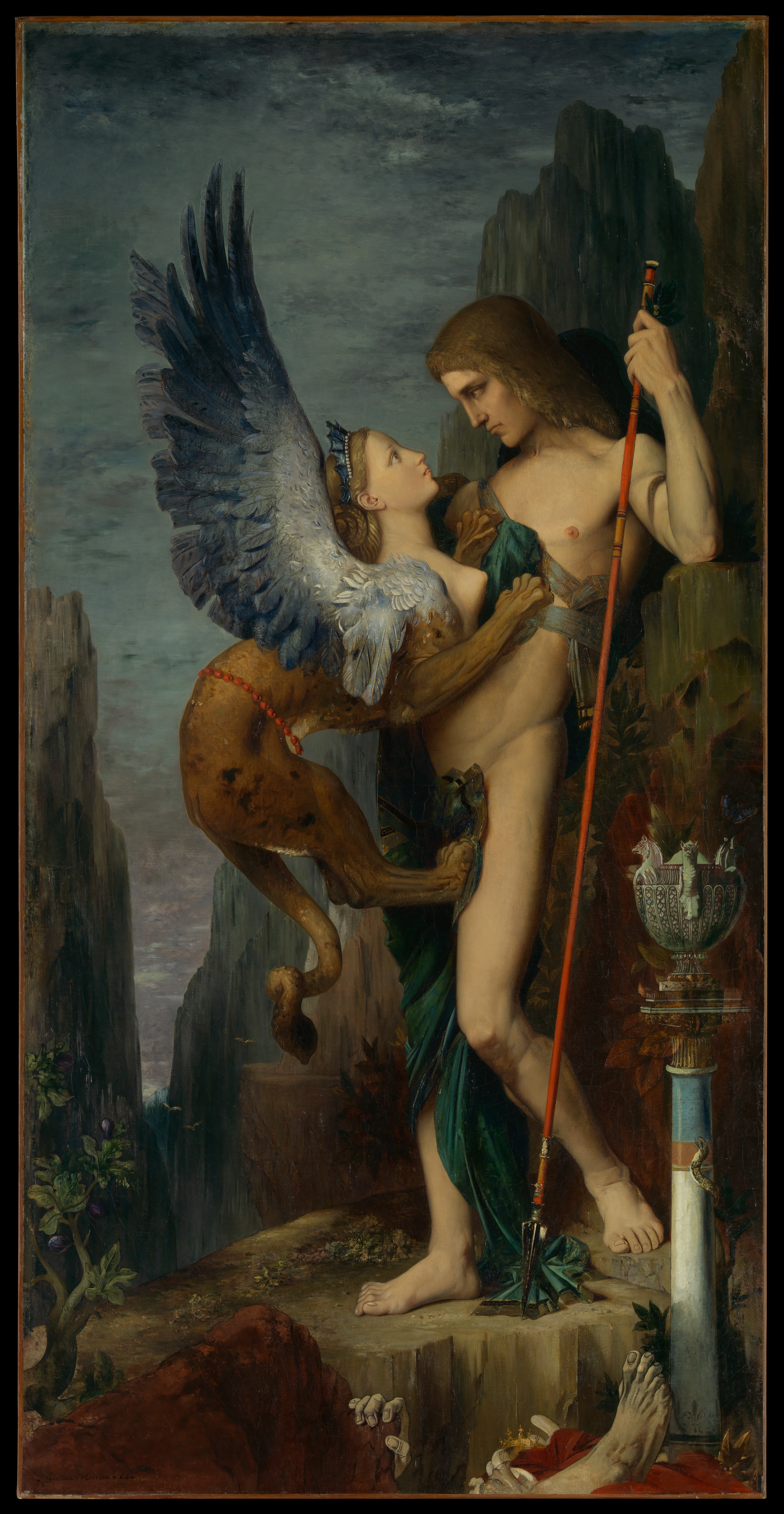
Oedipus and the Sphinx by Gustave Moreau

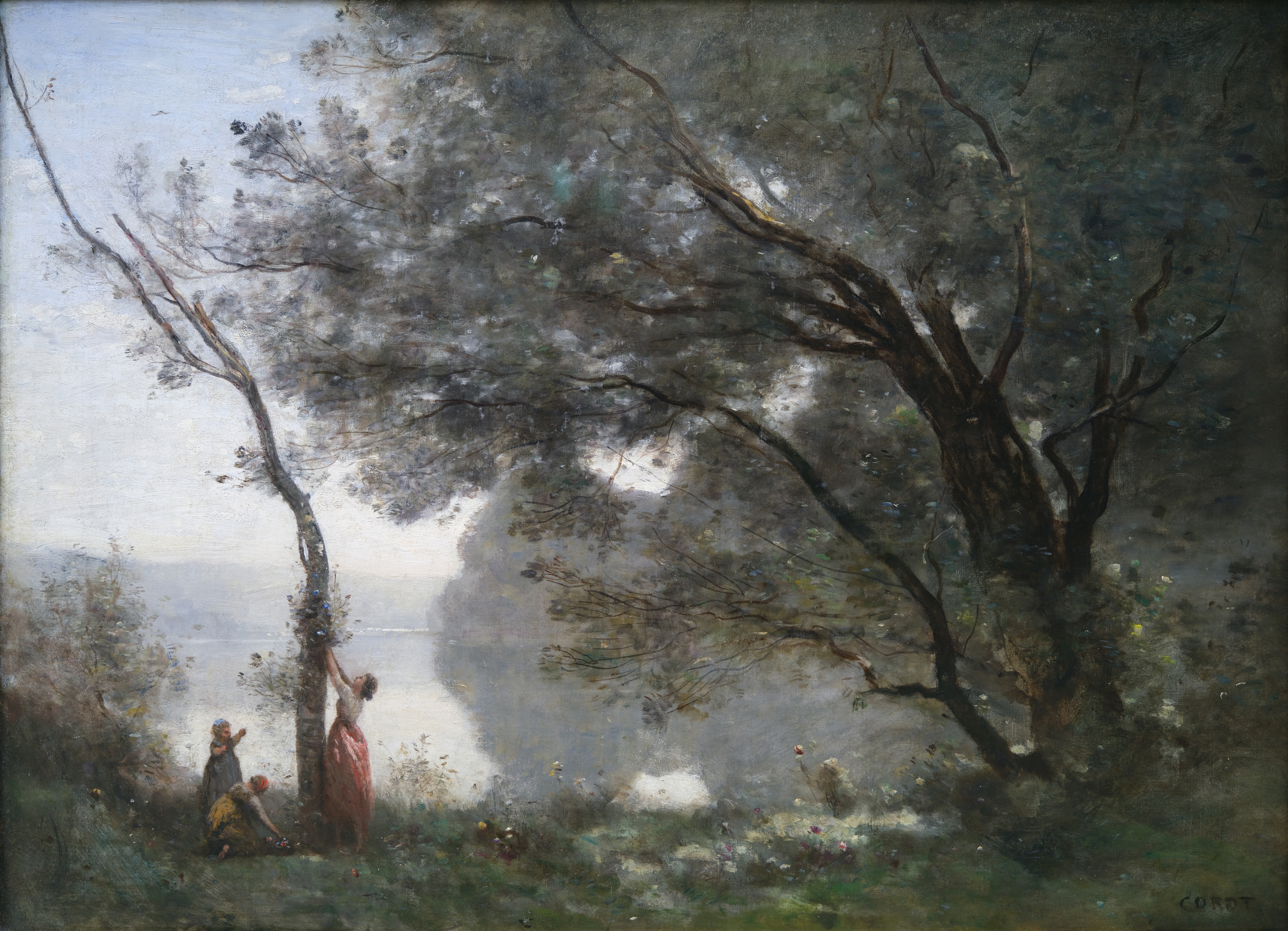
Souvenir de Mortefontaine by Jean-Baptiste Camille Corot

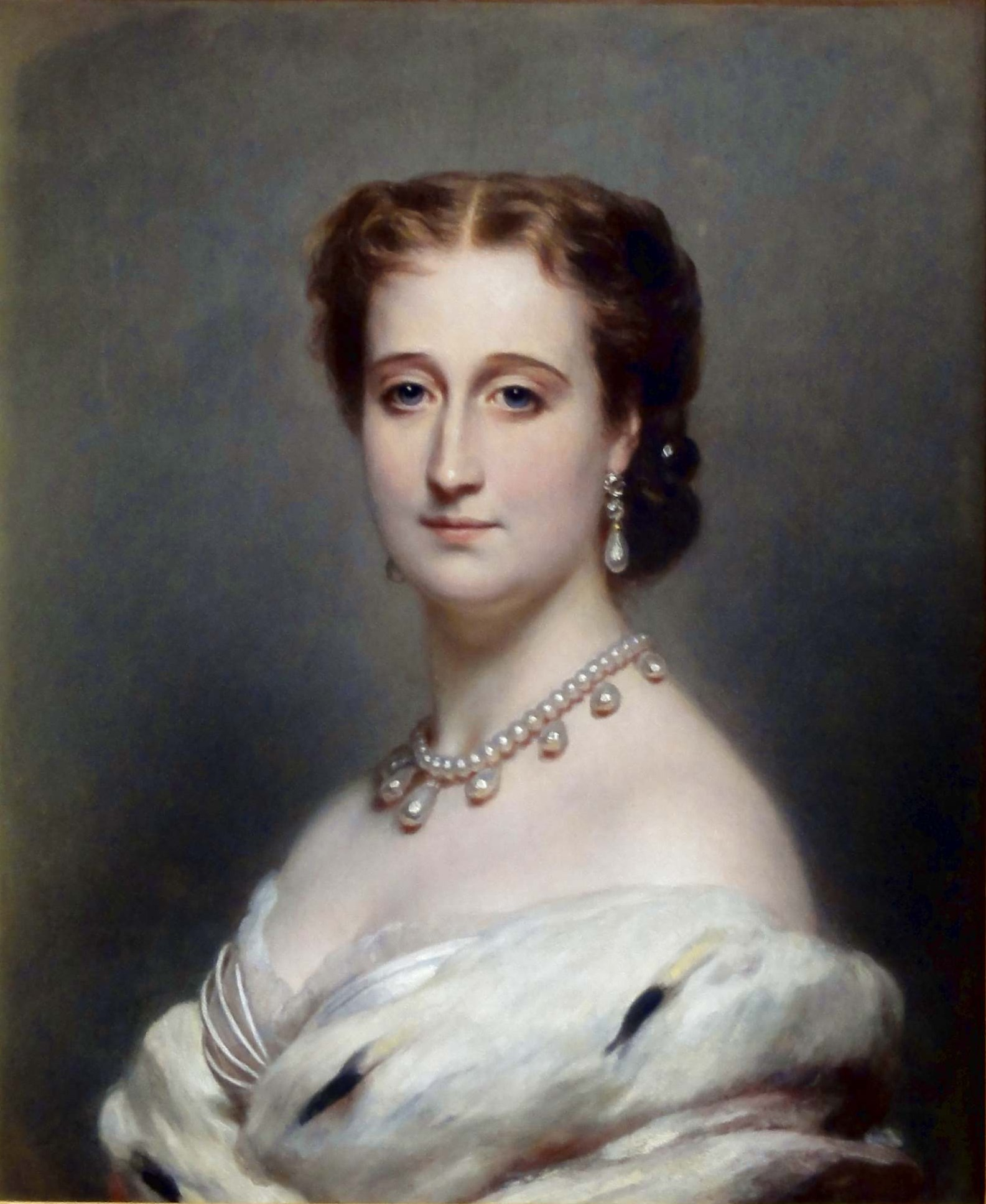
Portrait of Empress Eugénie by Franz Xaver Winterhalter

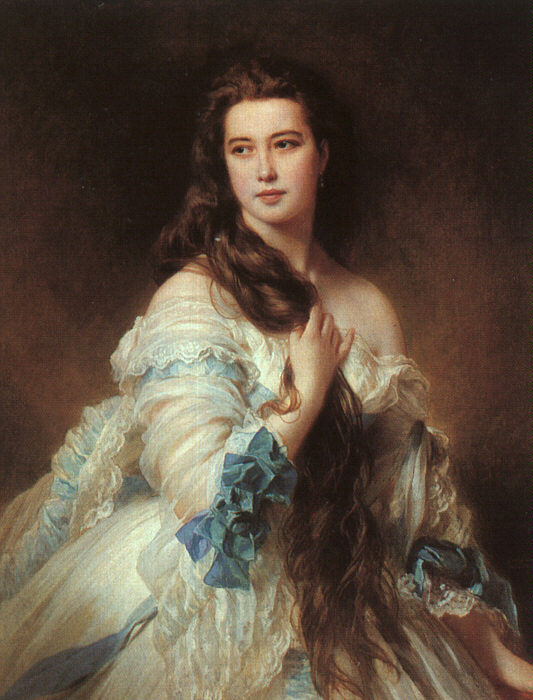
Portrait of Barbe de Rimsky-Korsakov by Franz Xaver Winterhalter

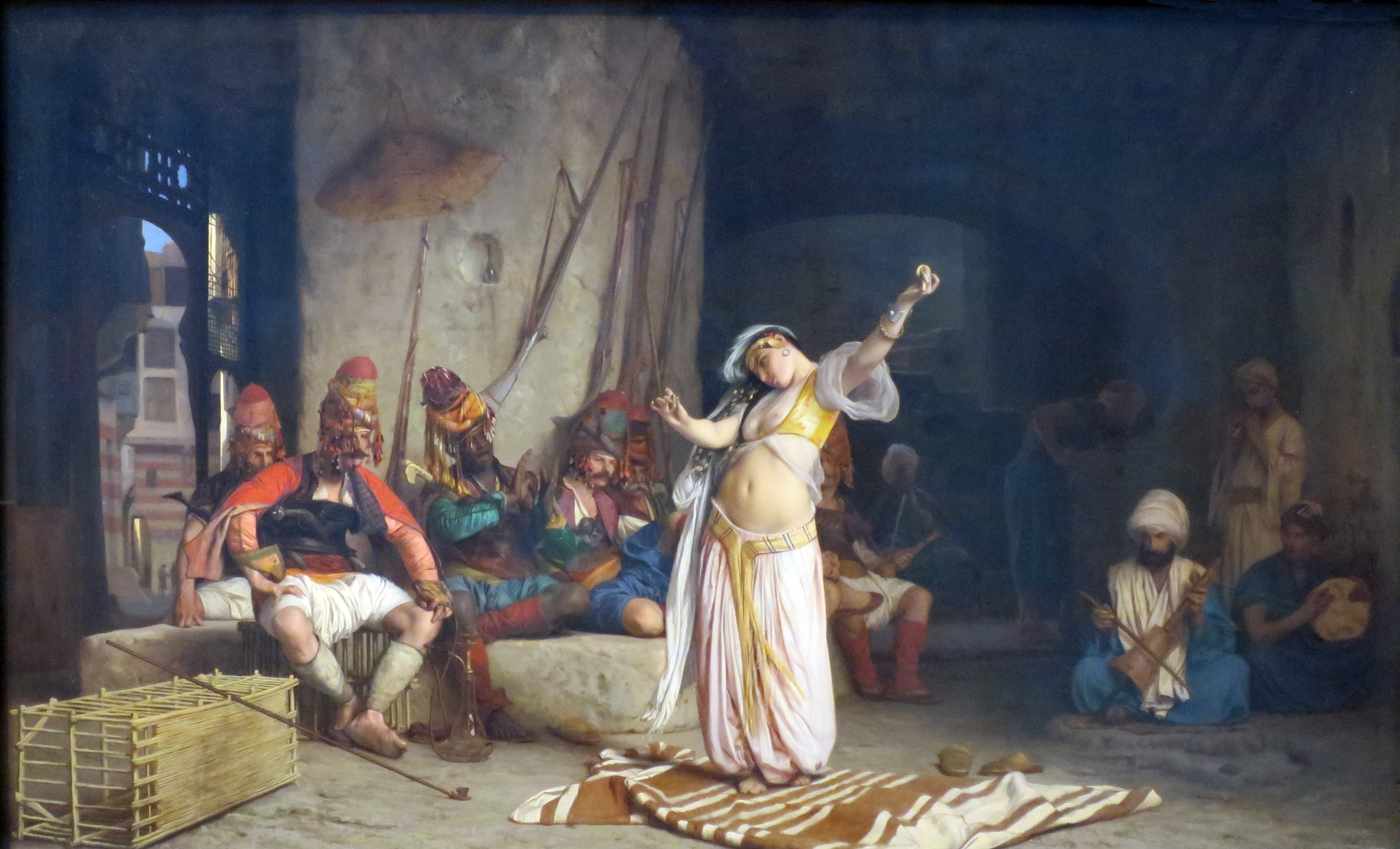
Dance of the Almeh by Jean-Léon Gérôme

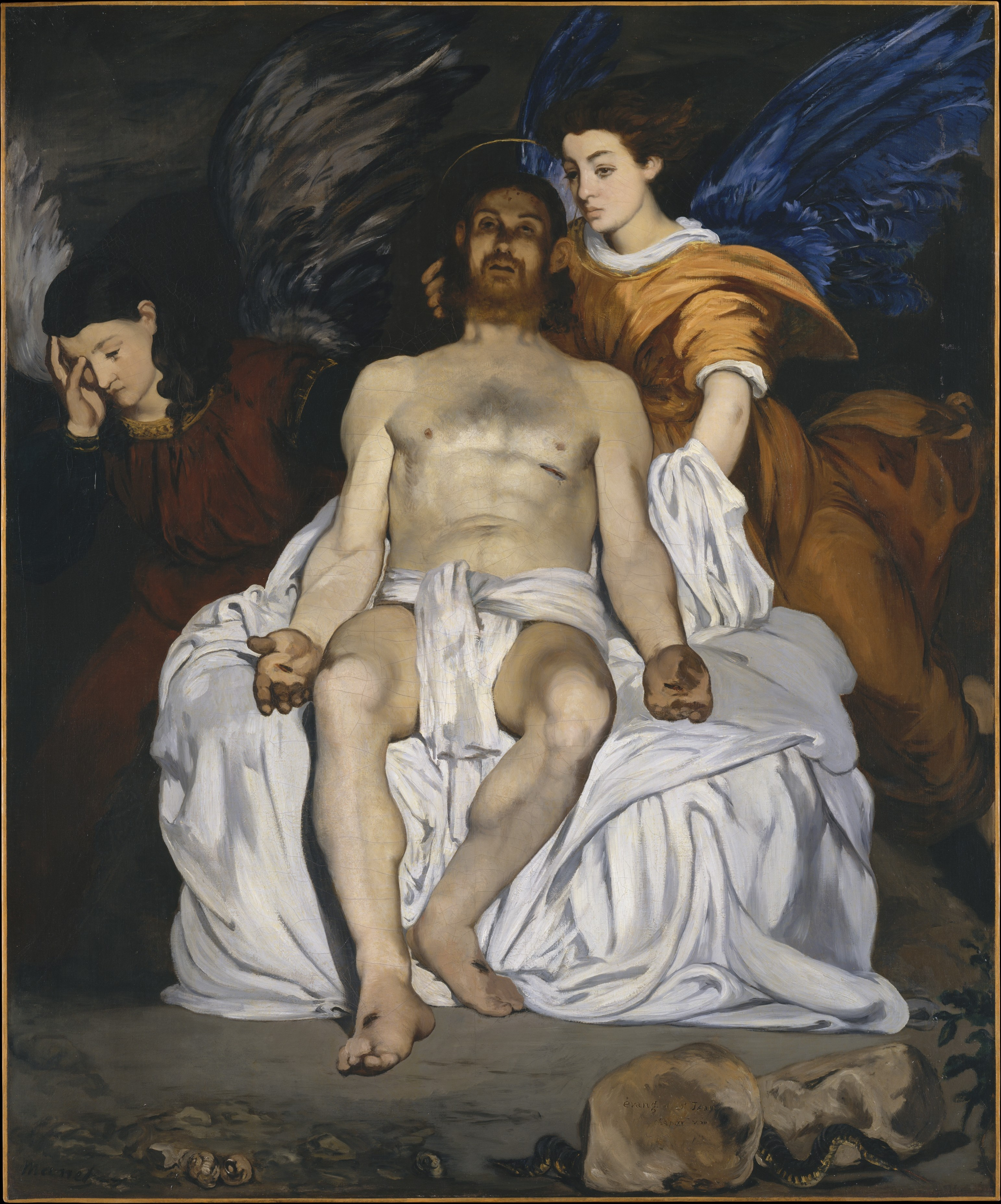
The Dead Christ with Angels by Édouard Manet

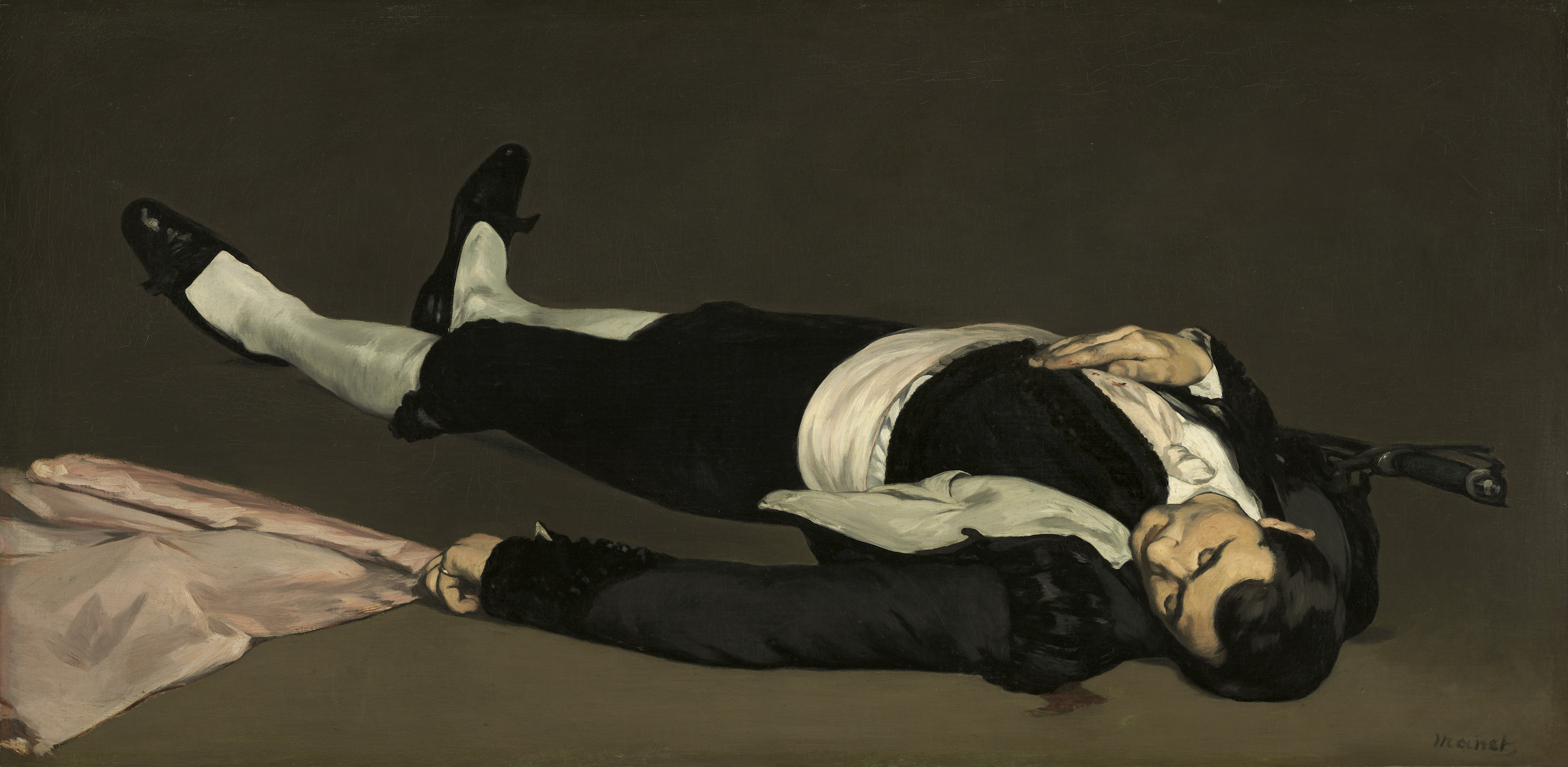
The Dead Toreador by Édouard Manet

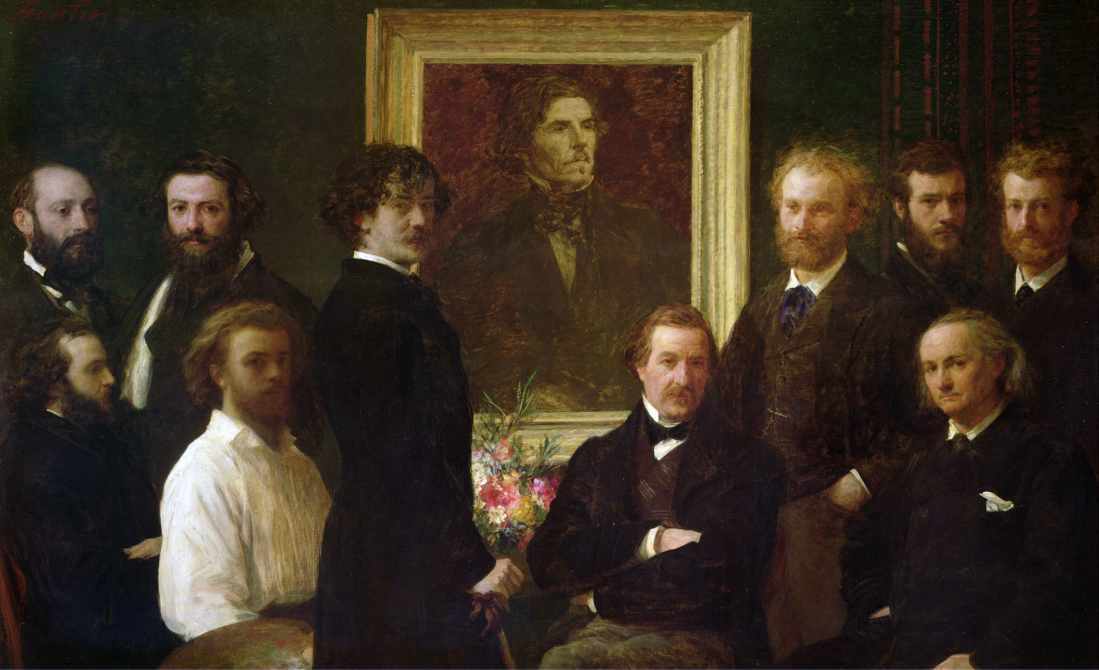
Homage to Delacroix by Henri Fantin-Latour

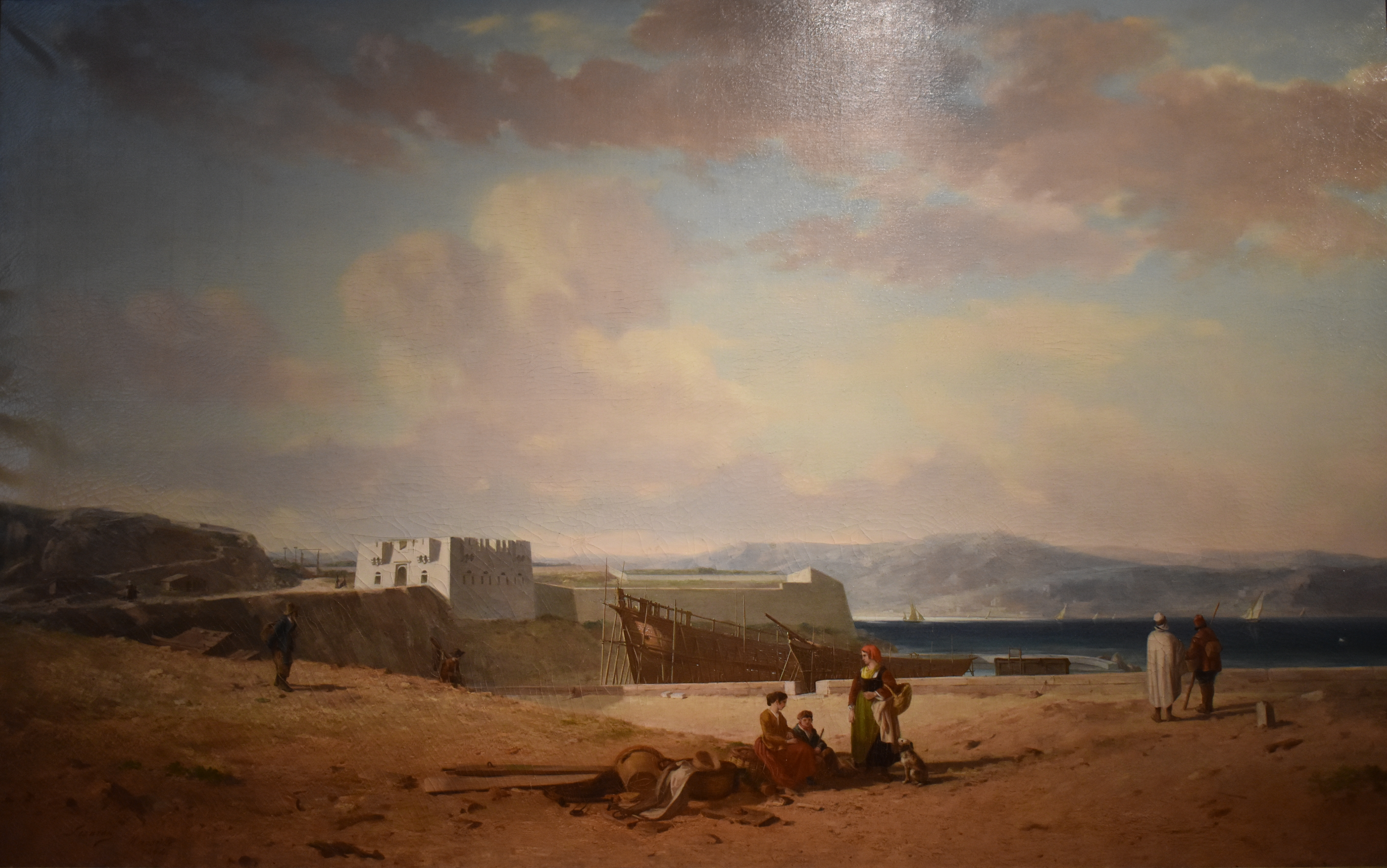
The Lighthouse in Marseille by Philippe-Auguste Jeanron

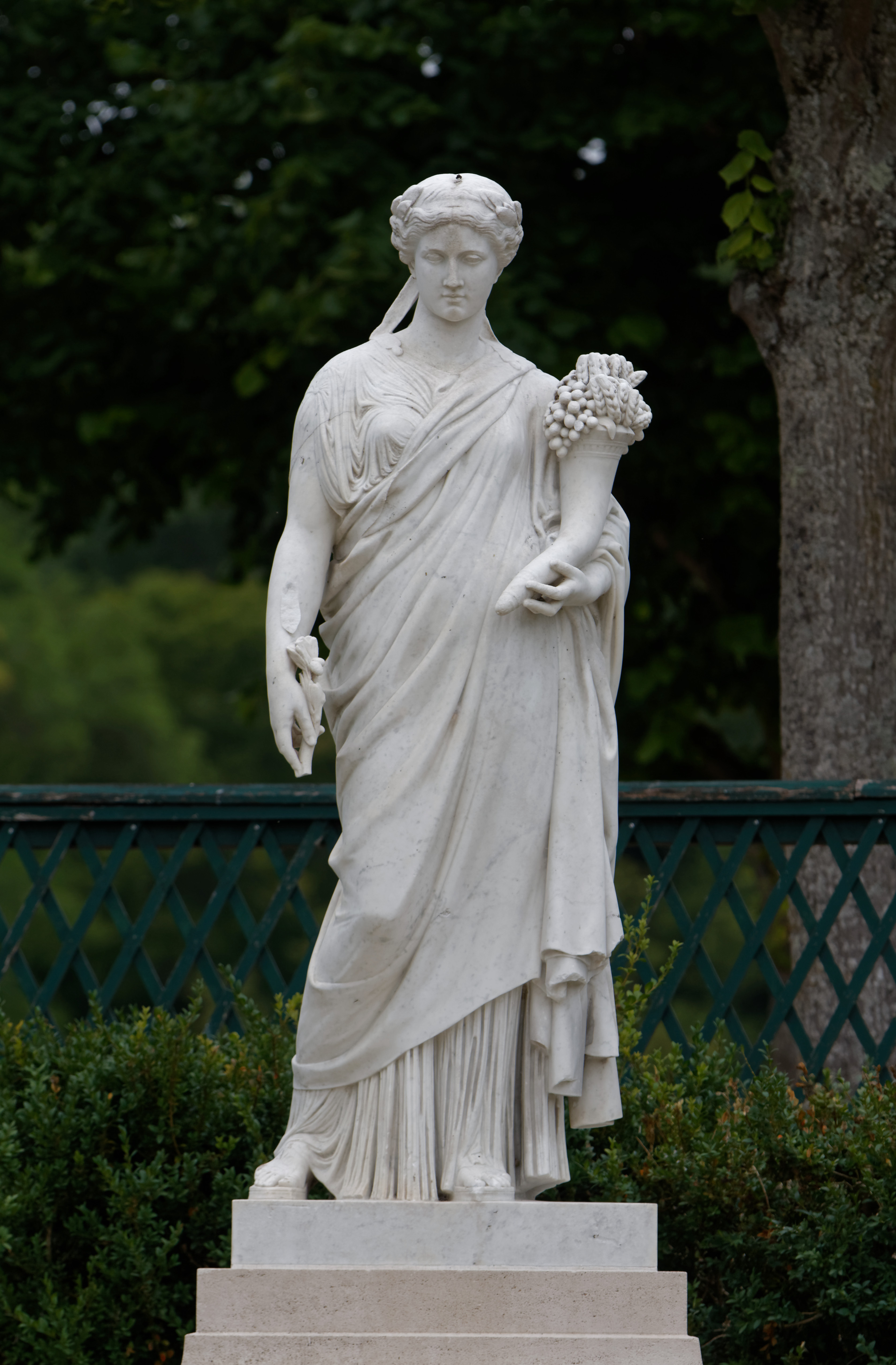
Peace by Antoine Watrinelle

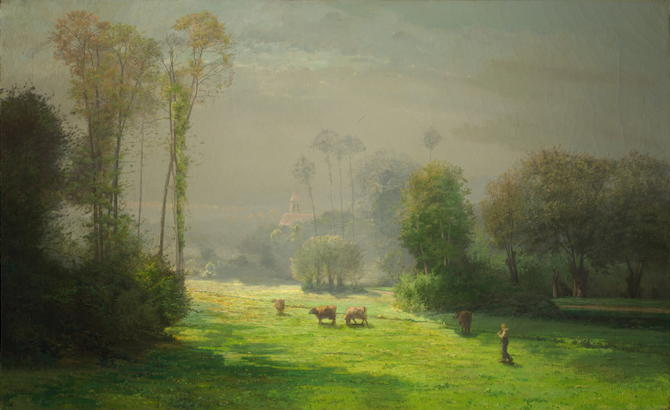
Le Soleil chasse le brouillard by Antoine Chintreuil

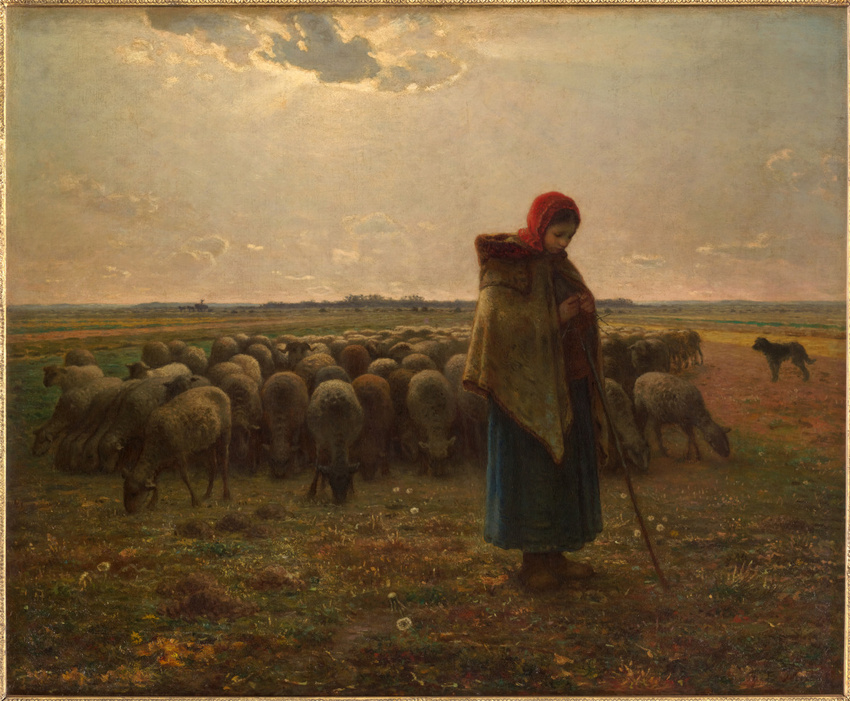
Shepherdess with her Flock by Jean-François Millet

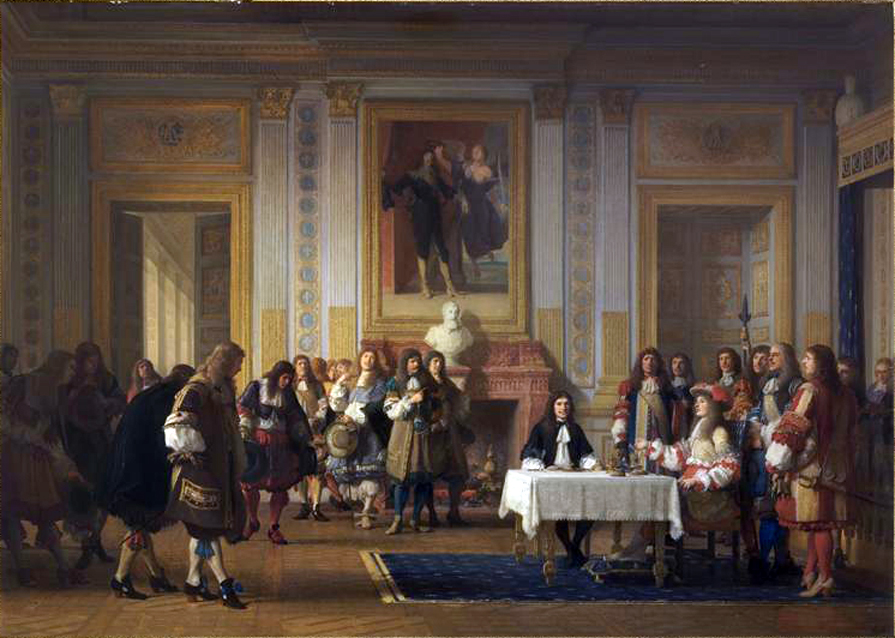
Molière received by Louis XIV by Jean Hégésippe Vetter

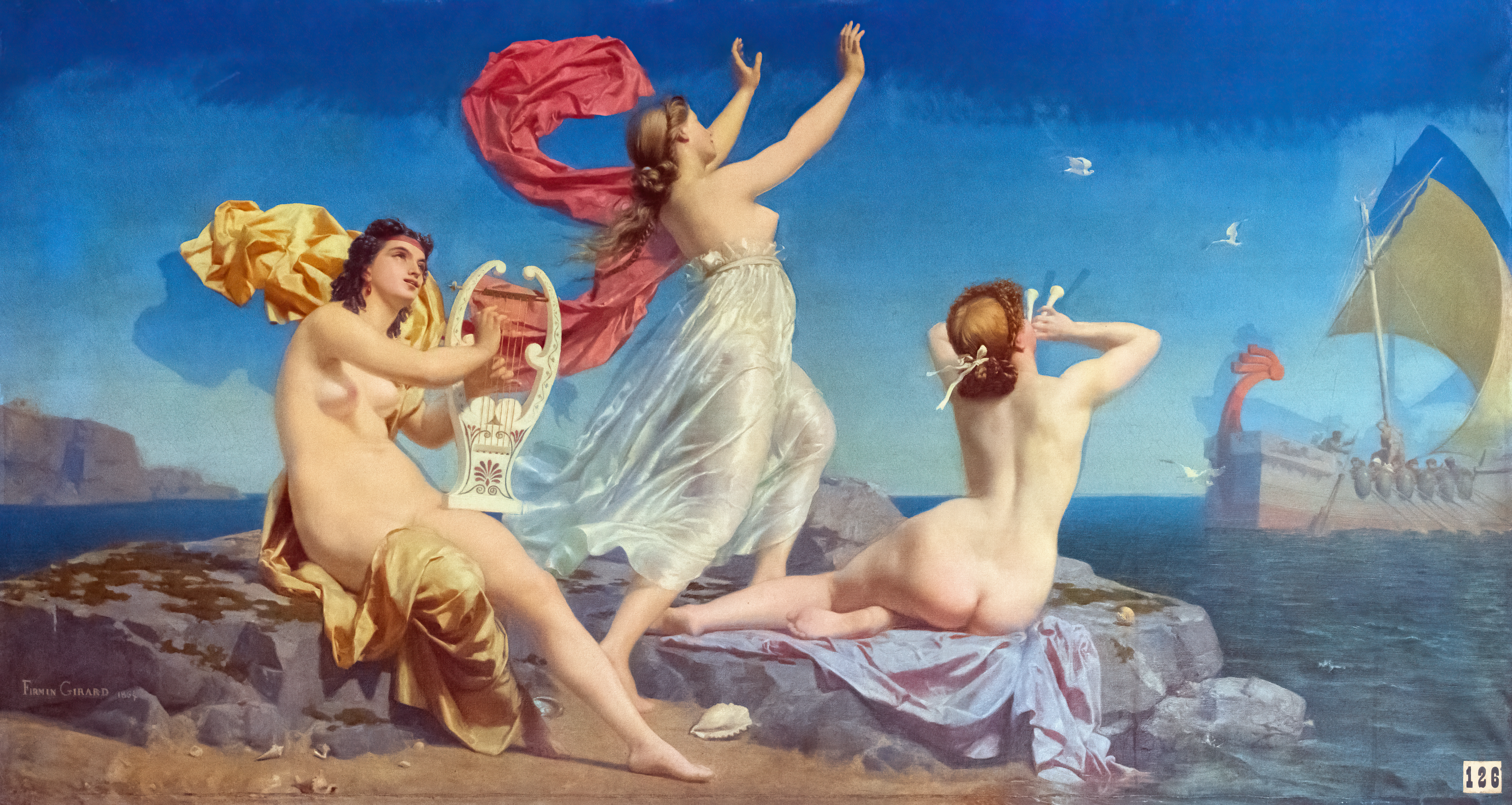
Ulysses and the Sirens by Marie-François Firmin-Girard

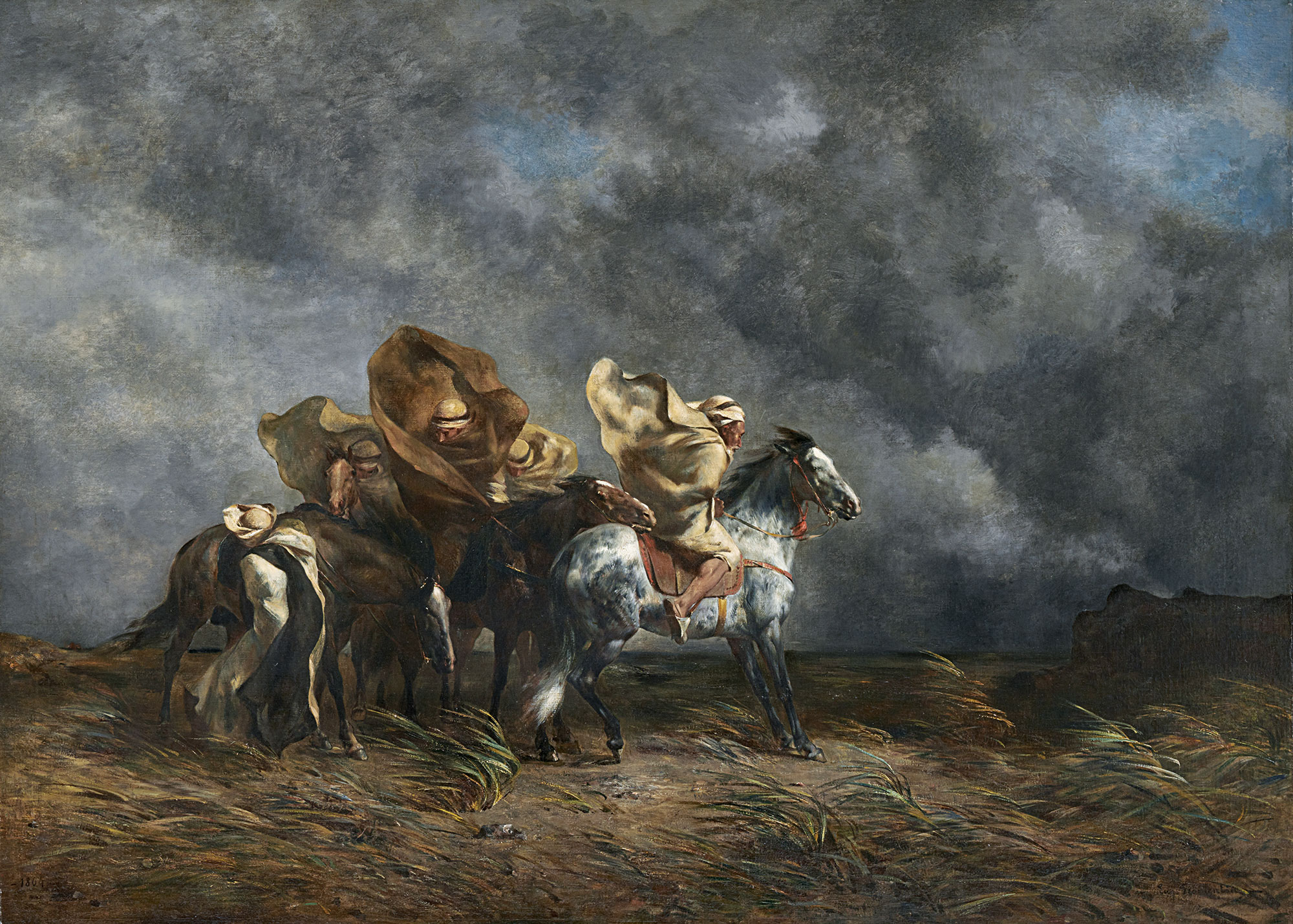
Windstorm on the Esparto Plains of the Sahara by Eugène Fromentin

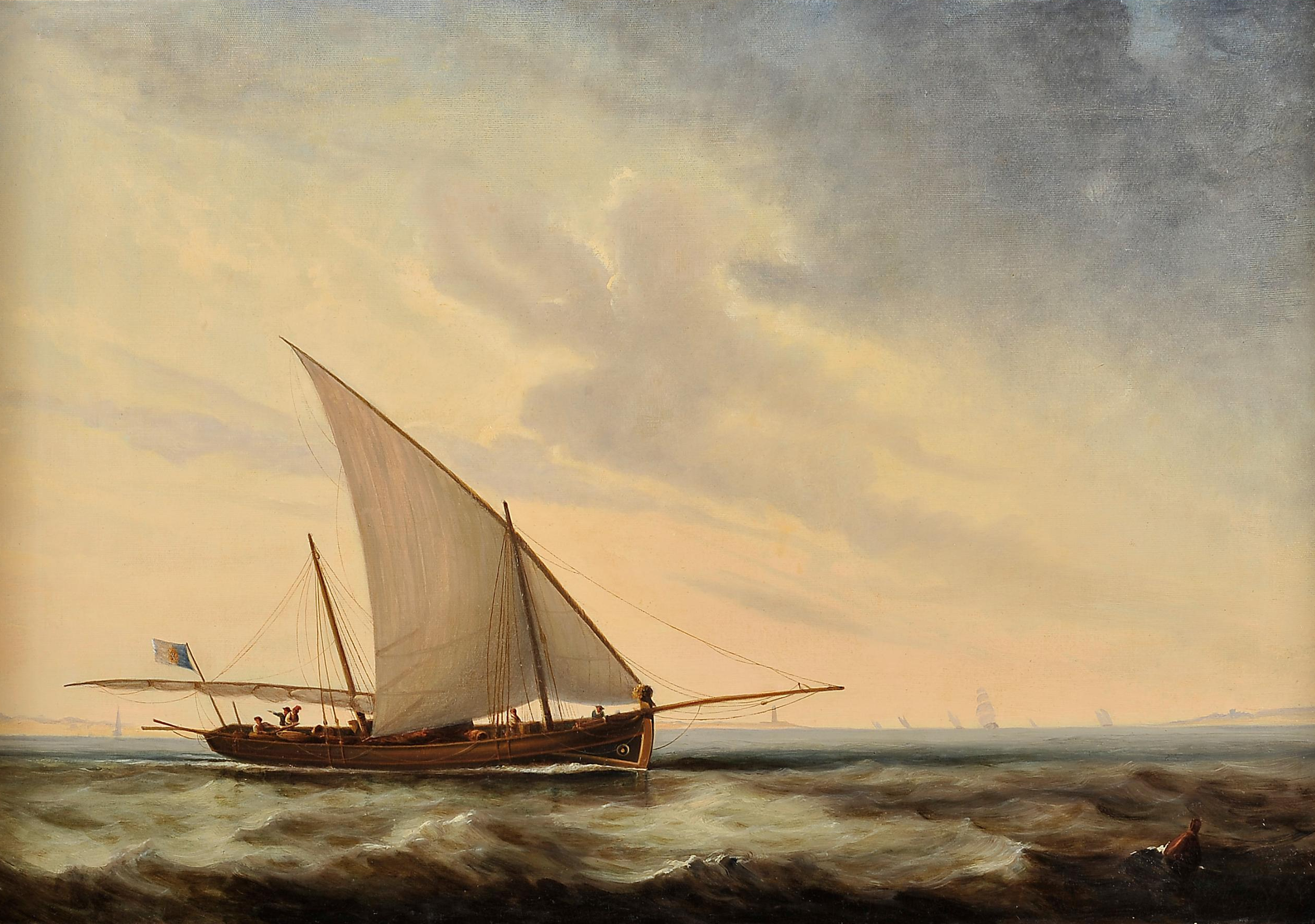
Vessels on the Tagus by Luiz Assencio Tomasini

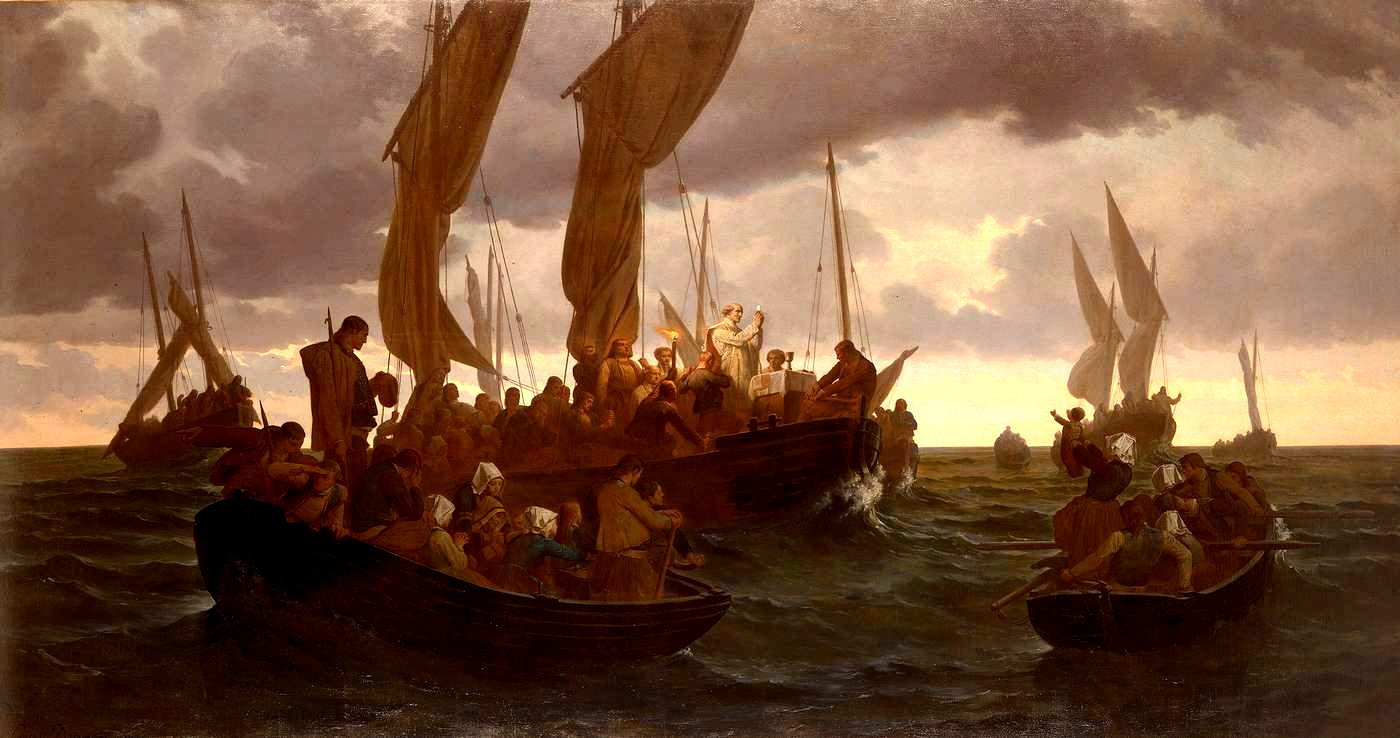
Mass at Sea by Louis Duveau

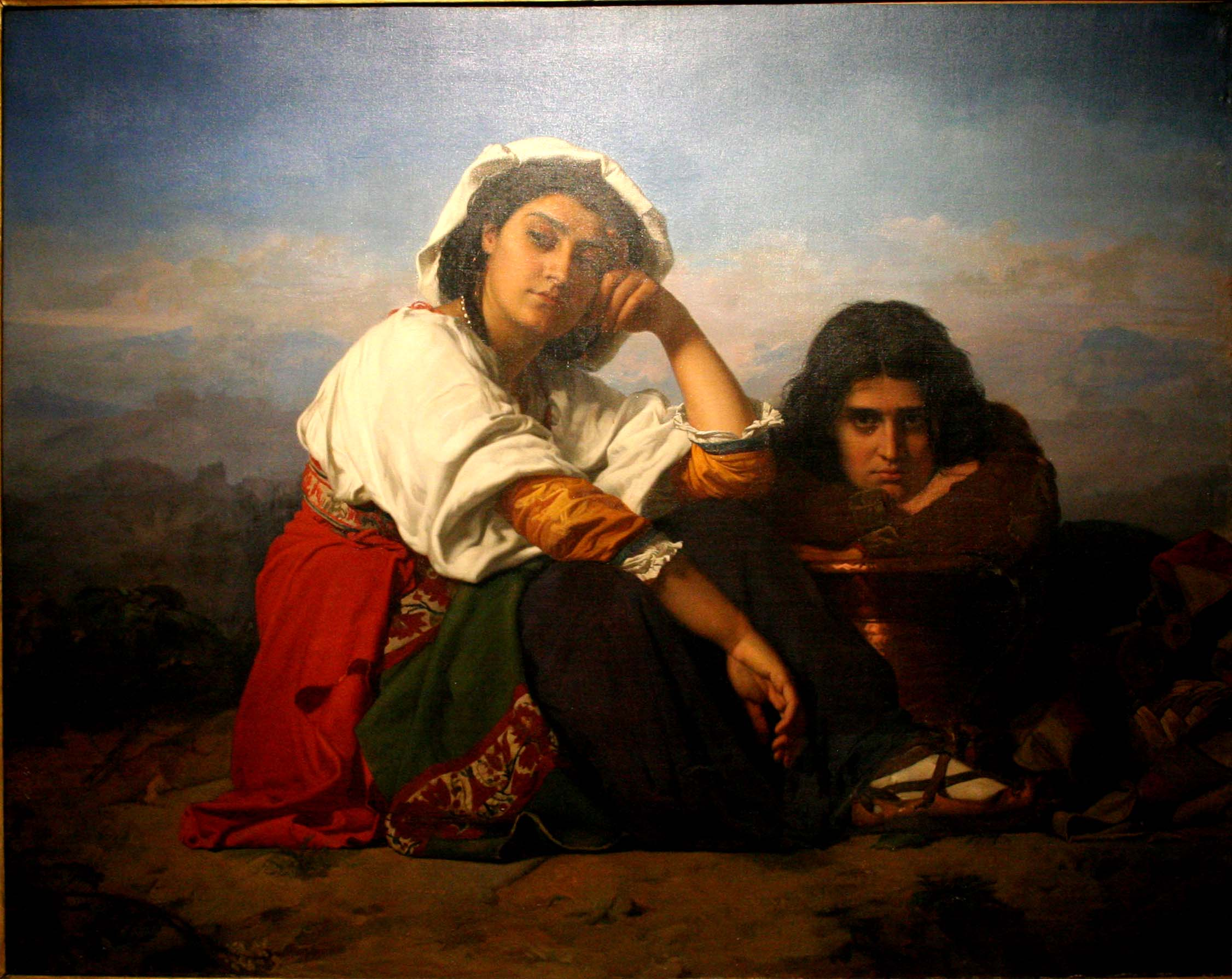
Le repos by Henri Lehmann

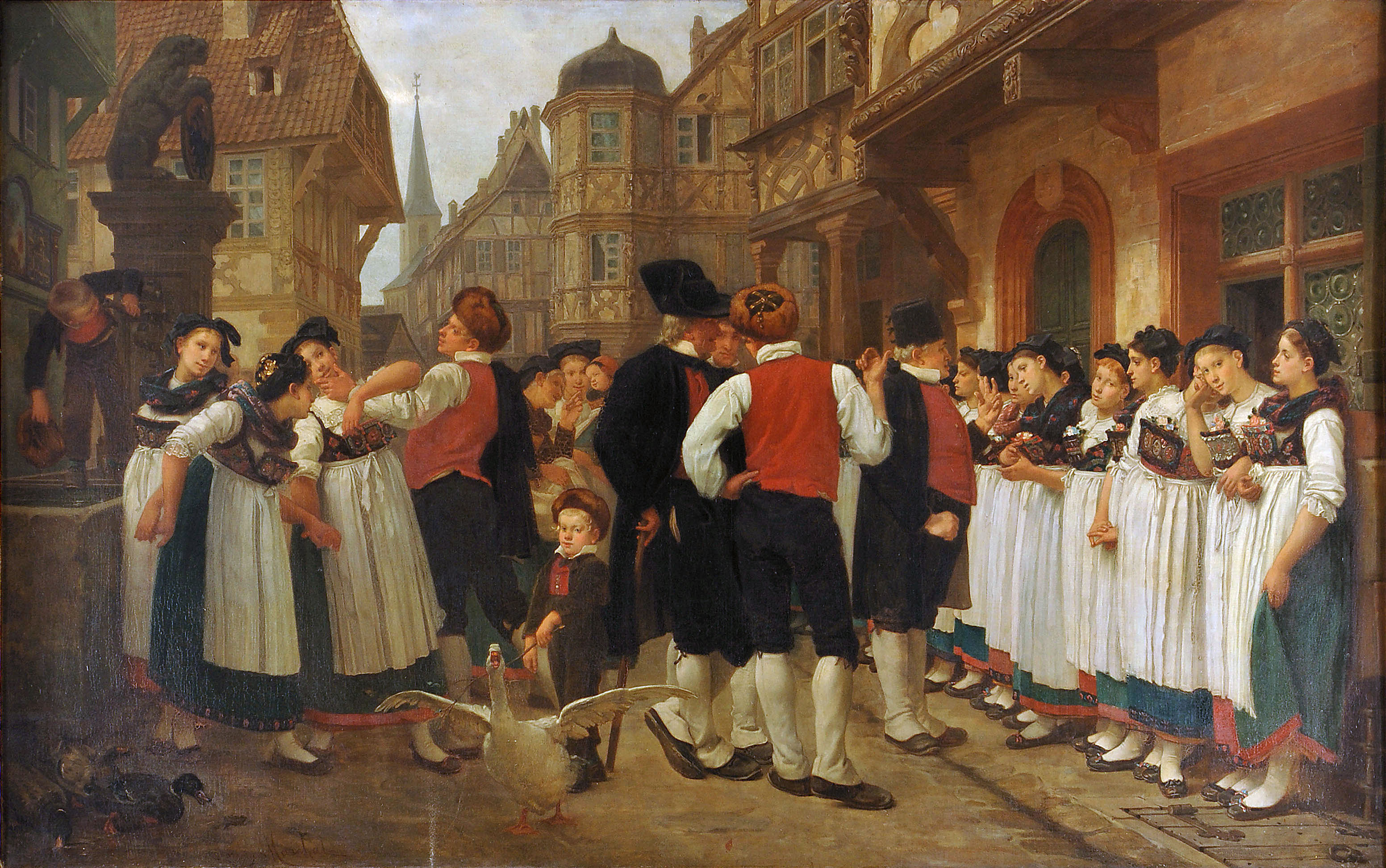
La foire aux servantes by Charles-François Marchal

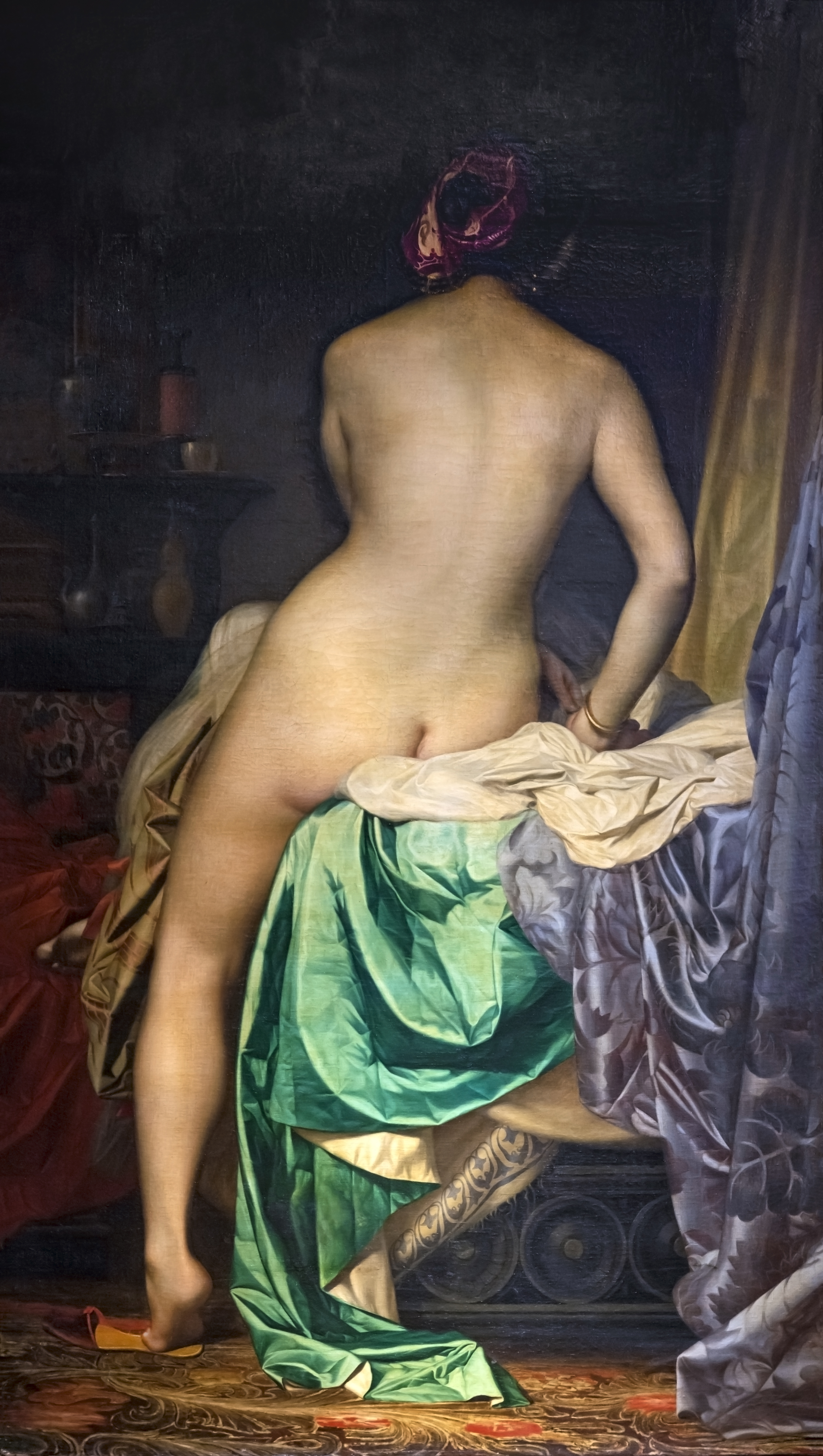
Galel by Armand Cambon

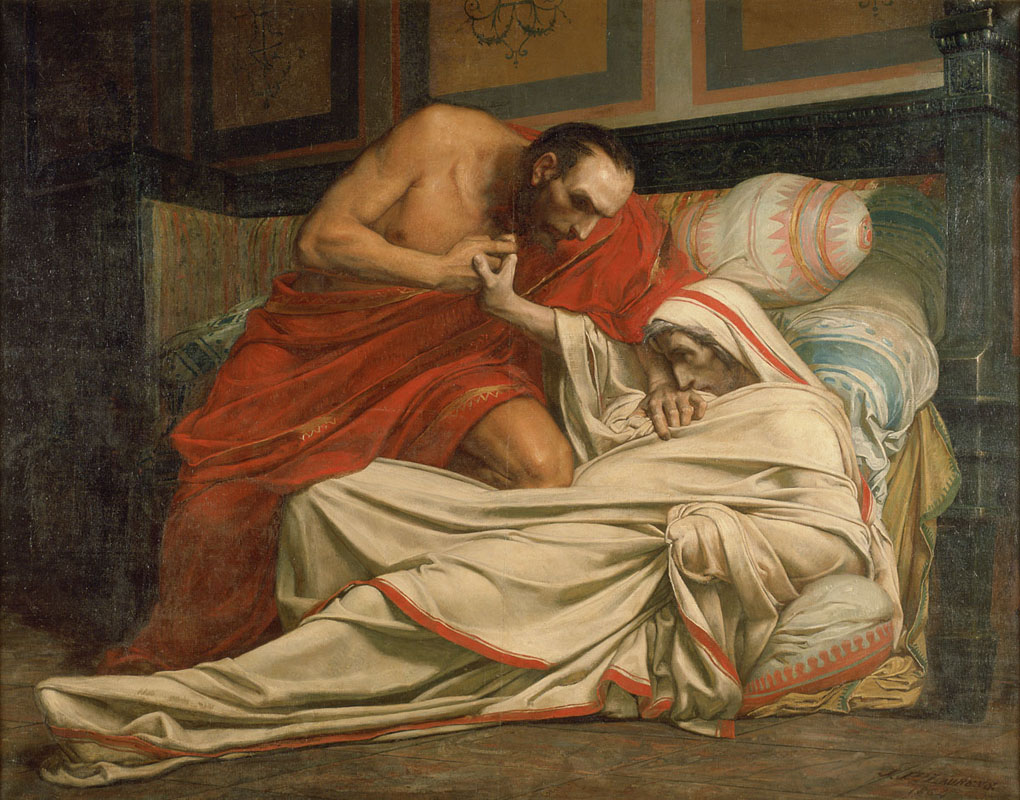
The Death of Tiberius by Jean-Paul Laurens

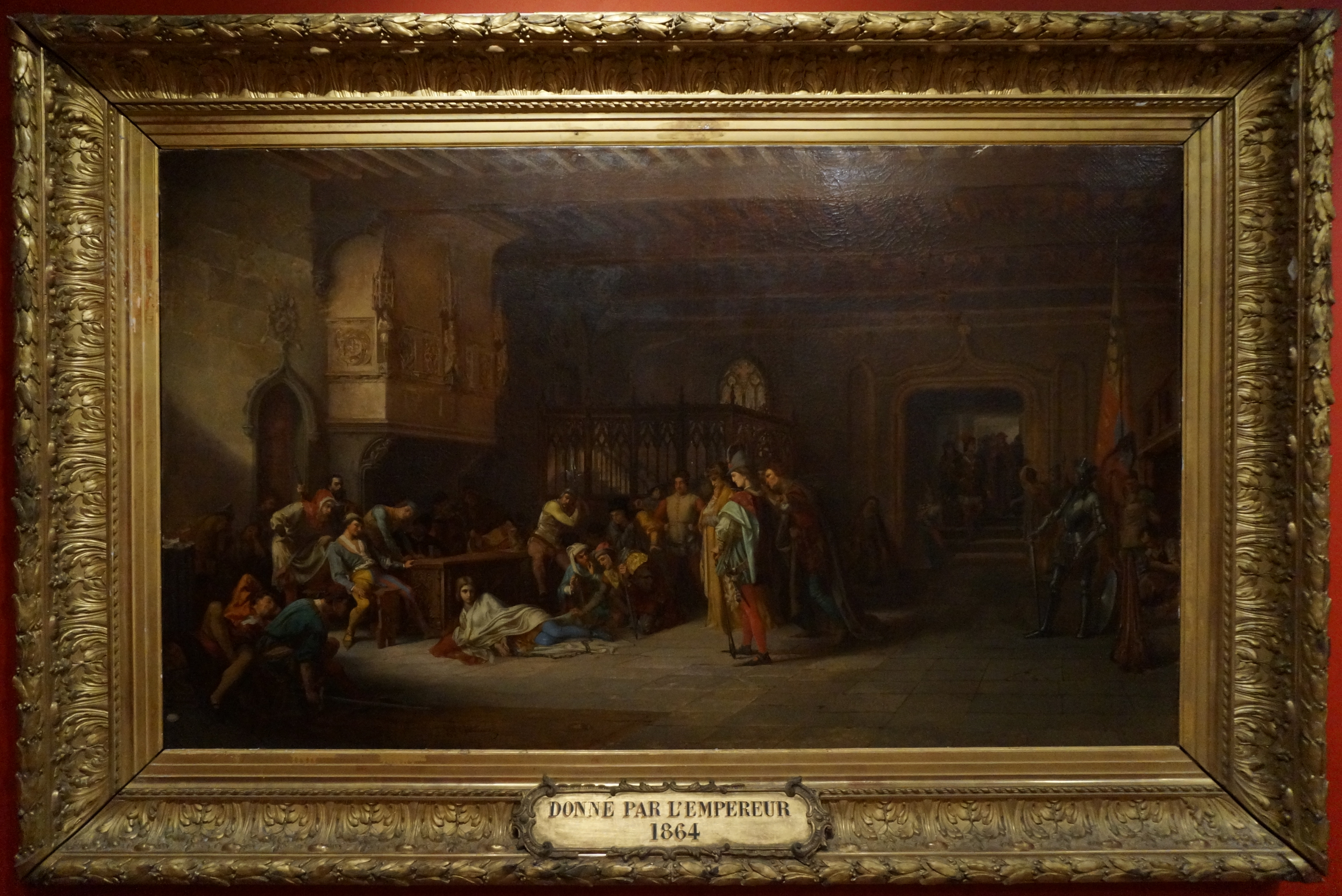
Joan of Arc, Prisoner of the English by Stanisław Chlebowski

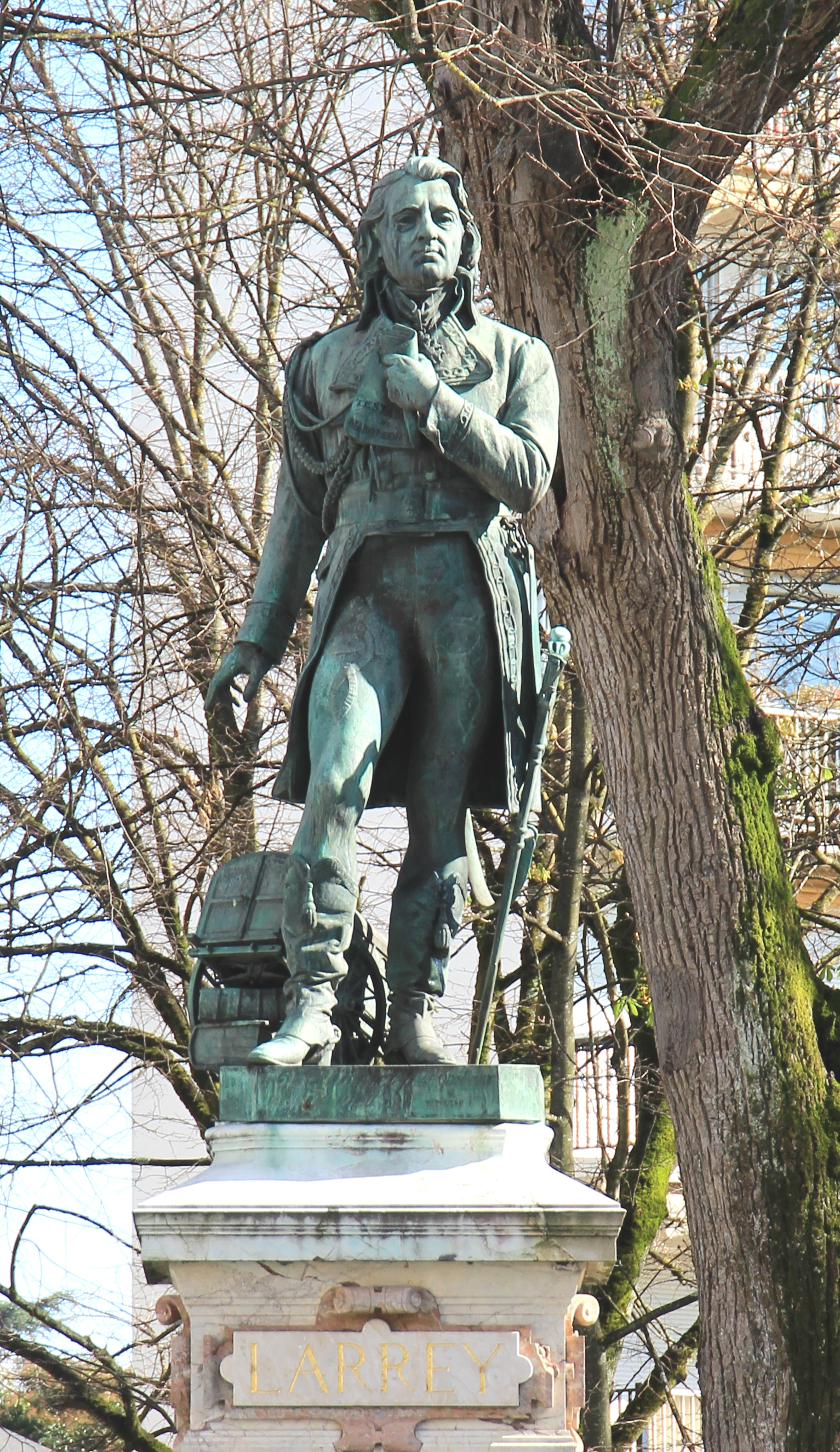
Statue of Dominique-Jean Larrey by Jacques Joseph Émile Badiou de la Tronchère

== See also ==
- Royal Academy Exhibition of 1864, held at the National Gallery in London

== Bibliography ==
- Ives, Colta Feller & Barker, Elizabeth E. Romanticism & the School of Nature. Metropolitan Museum of Art, 2000.
- Marshall, Nancy Rose & Warner, Malcolm. James Tissot: Victorian Life, Modern Love. Yale University Press, 1999.
- Milner, John. Art, War and Revolution in France, 1870-1871: Myth, Reportage and Reality. Yale University Press, 2000.
- Tinterow, Gary. Corot. Metropolitan Museum of Art, 1996.
- Tinterow, Gary & Loyrette, Henri. Origins of Impressionism. Metropolitan Museum of Art, 1994.
