= The Two Sisters (Tissot) =

Painting by James Tissot

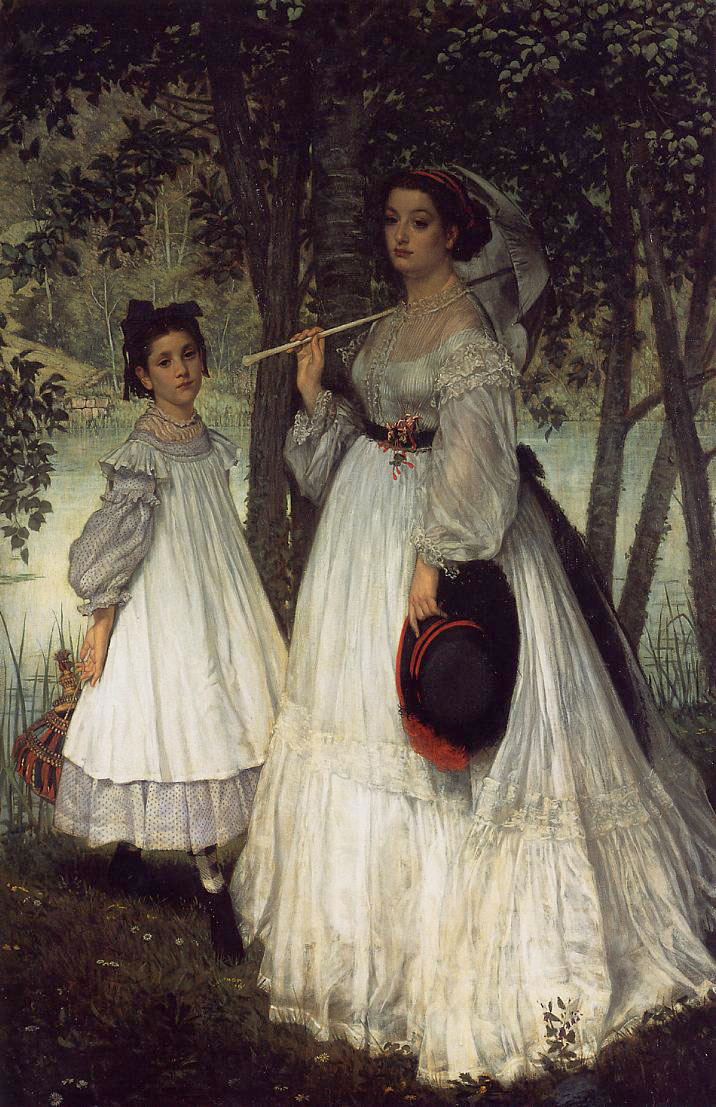
- Artist: James Tissot
- Year: 1863
- Type: Oil on canvas, genre painting
- Dimensions: 210 cm × 136 cm (83 in × 54 in)
- Location: Musée d'Orsay, Paris

The Two Sisters (French: Les deux soeurs) is an oil painting on canvas by the French artist James Tissot, from 1863.

It features two sisters, the elder holding a parasol, who look as if they have been surprised while taking a stroll in the woods. It drew inspiration from Gustave Courbet's 1857 painting Young Ladies Beside the Seine. The painting was displayed at the Salon of 1864 in Paris, where it caused a degree of controversy partly because it was produced en plein air. The same model featured in both this and his other submission to the Salon Portrait of Mademoiselle L.L.. Today it is in the city's Musée d'Orsay, having been acquired in 1904.

== Bibliography ==
- Cohen, Michael. Sisters: Relation and Rescue in Nineteenth-century British Novels and Paintings. Fairleigh Dickinson University Press, 1995.
- Marshall, Nancy Rose & Warner, Malcolm. James Tissot: Victorian Life, Modern Love. Yale University Press, 1999.
- Strauber, Susan Elizabeth. Women in Impressionism: From Mythical Feminine to Modern Woman. Skira, 2006.
