= The Dead Christ with Angels =

1864 oil painting by Édouard Manet

Le Christ mort et les anges
- The Dead Christ with Angels (English)
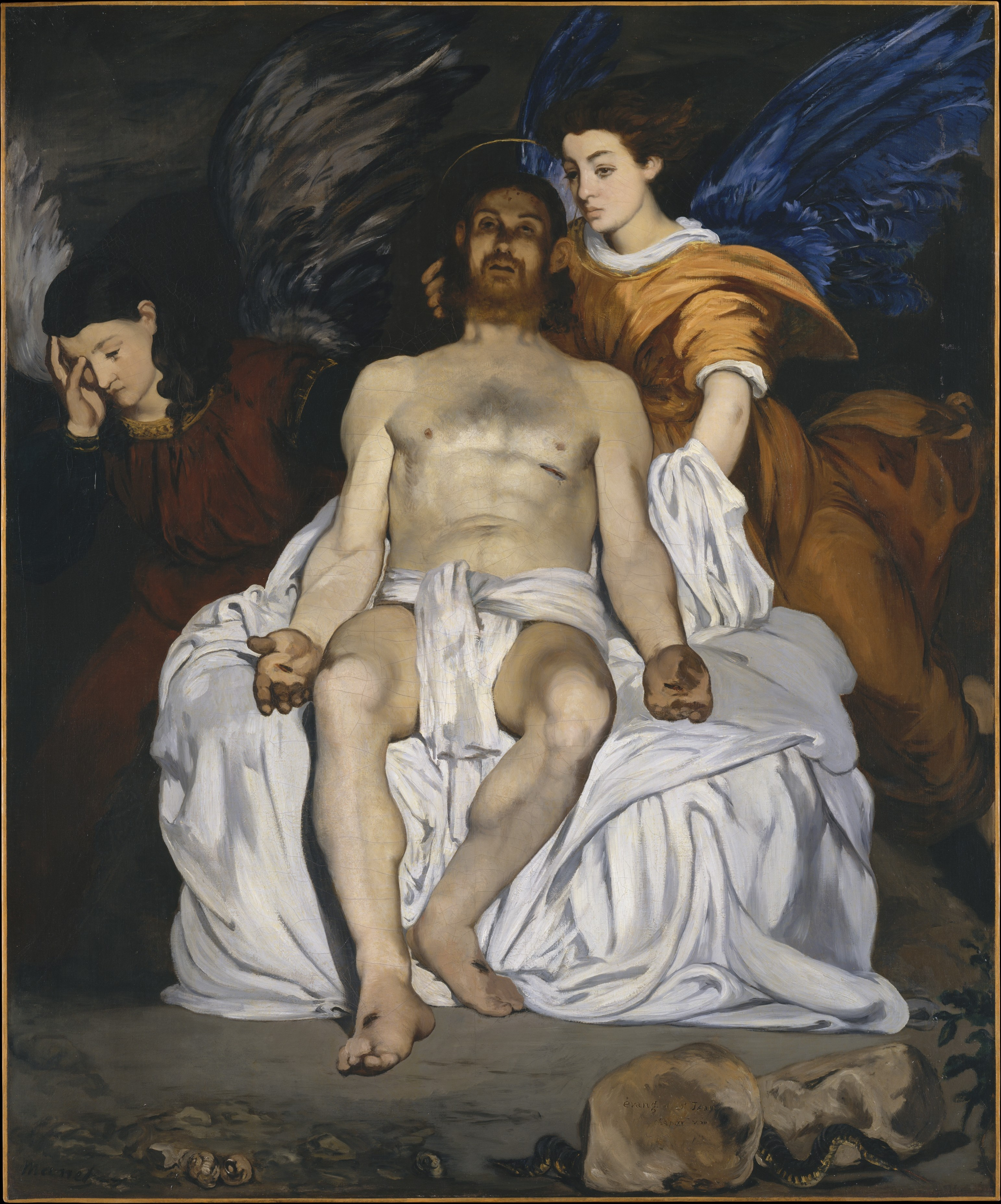
- Artist: Édouard Manet
- Year: 1864
- Medium: Oil on canvas
- Dimensions: 179.4 cm × 149.9 cm (70 5/8 in × 59 in)
- Location: Metropolitan Museum of Art, New York

The Dead Christ with Angels is an 1864 oil painting by French painter Édouard Manet. The painting depicts the biblical story (John 20:12) of Mary Magdalene entering the tomb of Jesus and seeing two angels but finding Jesus's body missing. It is now in the Metropolitan Museum of Art in New York City.

Manet seldom chose to paint images with religious meaning, and he tended to focus on contemporary subjects. John Hunisak speculates that Manet may have wanted to display a religious work at the Salon of 1864 because of the negative reaction he had received for his recent paintings of modern subjects. Manet may have hoped, Hunisak suggests, that the more traditional topic, with a contemporary twist, would please his supporters and critics alike.

== Description ==
This work sparked controversy and confusion among viewers due to certain stylistic choices Manet made in representing the story.

Most notably, Manet shows the two angels with the body of the dead Christ still visible. The Bible verses referenced describe the angels dressed in white, however Manet's choice was to depict them dressed in bright red and orange colors. Vladimir Gurewich suggests that this decision was most likely meant to heighten the drama of the scene.

A stone in the lower right section of the painting is inscribed with the chapter in the Gospel of John that the work is based upon. The direct verse reference is debated due to the style that the lowercase v is written in: it either refers to the Roman numeral V, or as an abbreviation for vers ("verse"). Depending on this interpretation, the painting is a depiction of either John 20:5-12 or John 20:12.

Jesus's spear wound is also shown on the wrong side of his body, which Manet realized only after he had submitted the painting to the Salon. Art historians have drawn attention to the shifted wound as a mirrored image of Christ, however historical accounts note that this change was completely unintentional on the artist's part. Therefore, the reading of the wound as a deeper, "mirrored" meaning is merely speculative interpretation.

== Critical reaction ==
Critics and many of Manet's supporters were confused by the new artistic direction that he took in the painting. The contradictions within The Dead Christ with Angels are characteristic of Manet's earlier exploration of discordances: the brightly colored angels contrast with the neutral background; the angels are not aligned; and the cloth is variously realistic and abstract. The technique used to paint Jesus, most notably the blurring seen in his hand and feet, also shows movement typical of Manet's work. Despite the similarities in technique, the scene attracted attention due to its lack of alignment with Manet's previous works.

== Related works ==
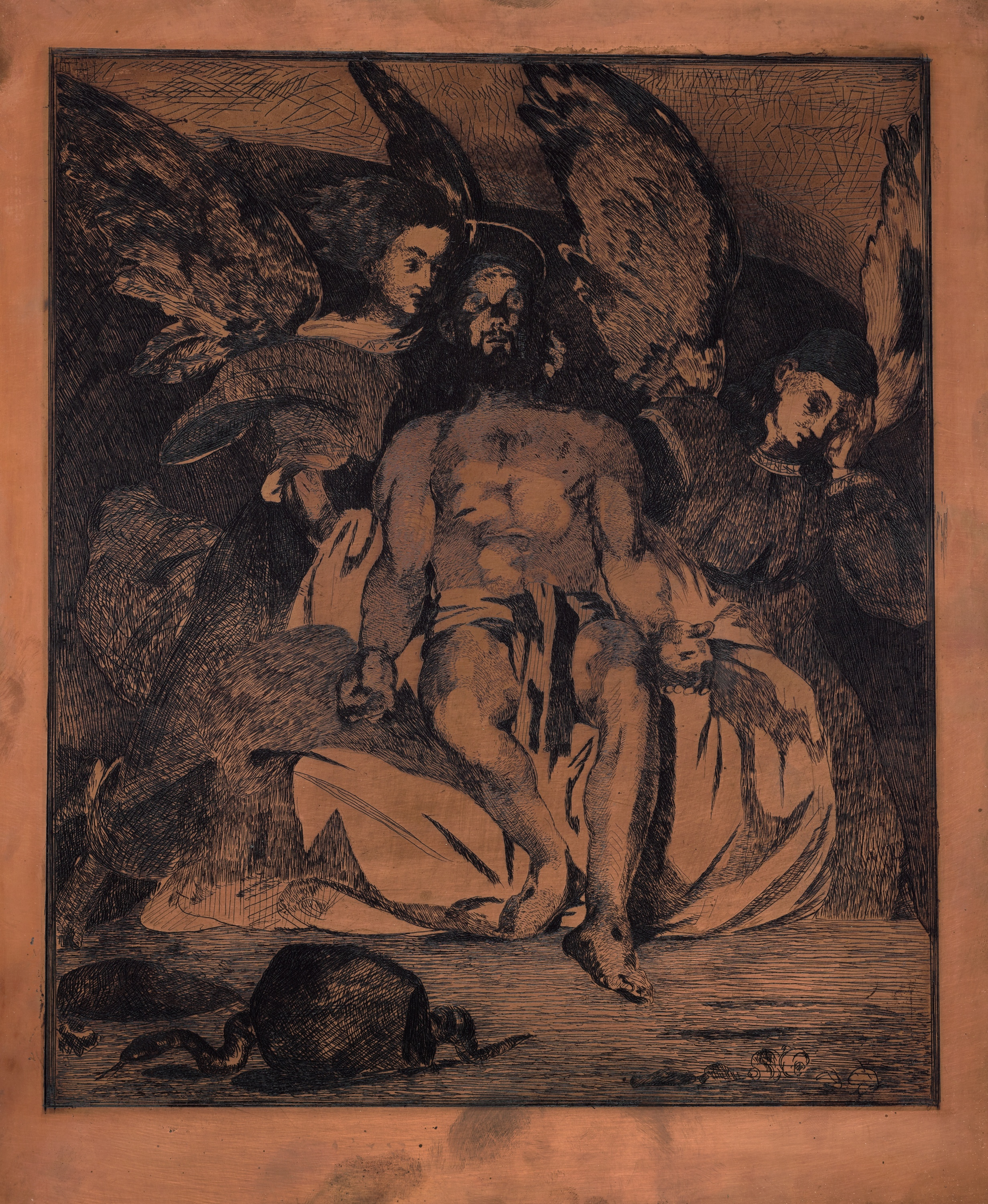
The Dead Christ with Angels (1866-1867), copperplate etching and aquatint. Art Institute of Chicago.

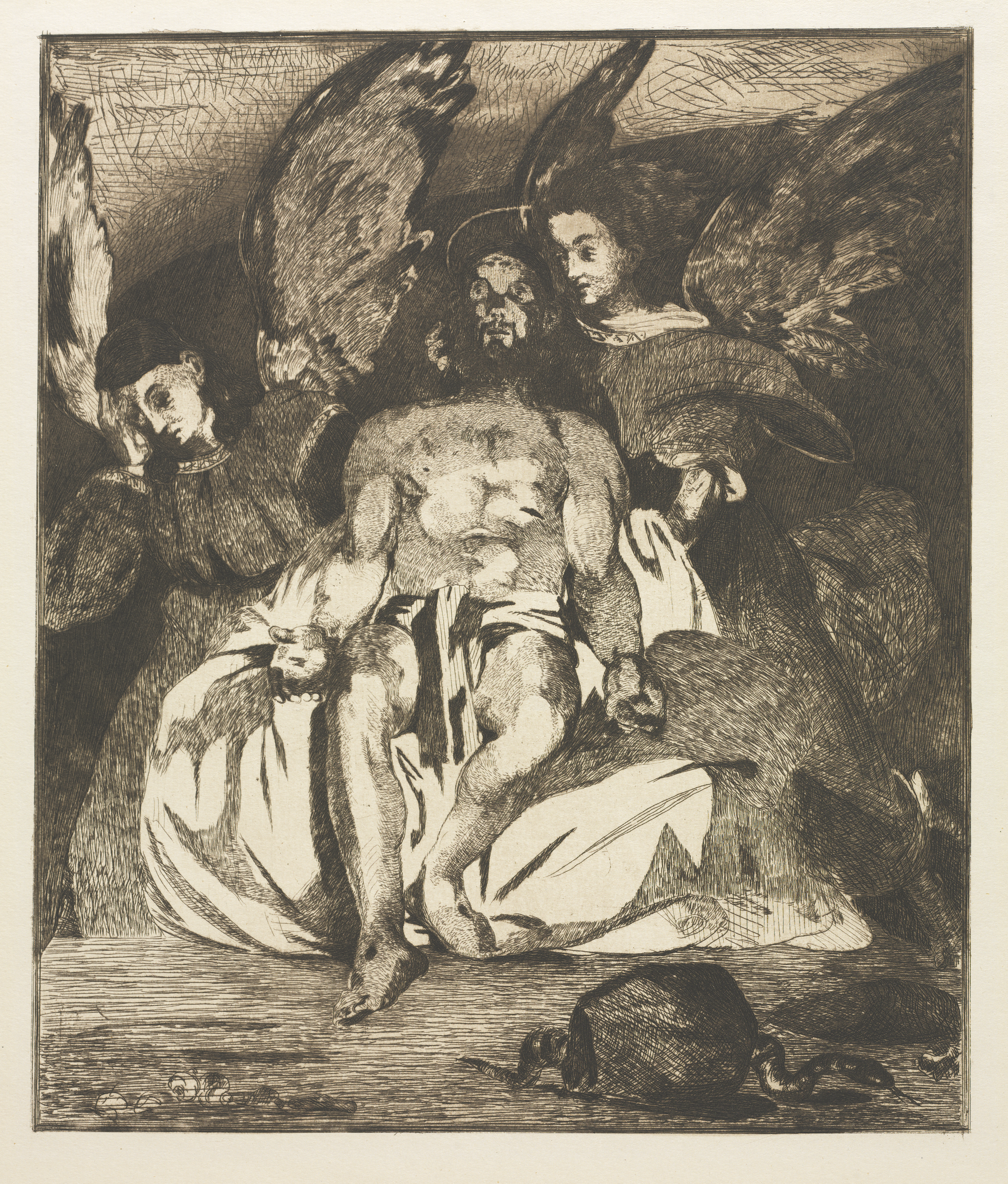
The Dead Christ with Angels (1866–1867), etching and aquatint. Cleveland Museum of Art

In 1866 or 1867 Manet produced an etching with aquatint of the painting. Impressions are in many collections, including the Art Institute of Chicago and the Cleveland Museum of Art.

The Dead Christ with Angels is often associated with the book Vie de Jésus by Ernest Renan, published in 1863, a year before Manet's painting was first exhibited. In the book, Renan denies Christ's resurrection from the dead, and emphasizes the idea that miracles do not exist. Renan's work is credited as a potential influence for Manet because the inscribed verse, John 20:12, served as the book's main argument in the denial of Christ's resurrection. The painting also shows the angels grieving over death instead of happily announcing a resurrection, which is often used as proof to demonstrate the artistic influence Renan had on Manet.

== See also ==
- List of paintings by Édouard Manet
- 1864 in art
