= French Campaign, 1814 (Meissonier) =

Painting by Ernest Meissonier

- Campagne de France, 1814 (French)
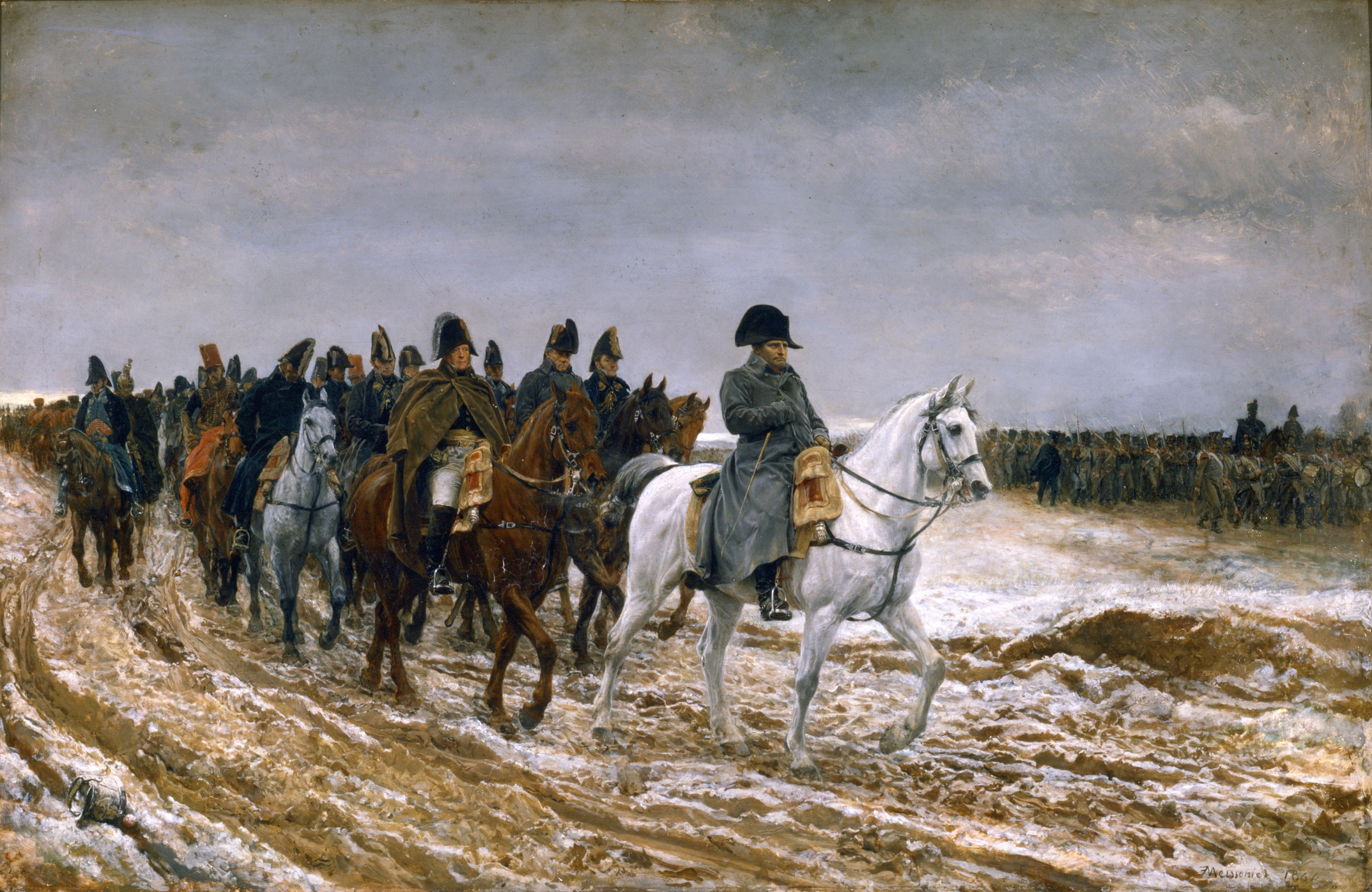
- Artist: Ernest Meissonier
- Year: 1860–1864
- Medium: Oil on wood
- Dimensions: 51.5 cm × 76.5 cm (20.3 in × 30.1 in)
- Location: Musée d'Orsay, Paris

French Campaign, 1814 (French: Campagne de France, 1814, alternative title: 1814) is an oil on wood painting by French painter Ernest Meissonier, created between 1860 and 1864. French Campaign, 1814 is one of the best-known artworks of Meissonier, and it is part of his Napoleonic cycle of paintings, with 1807, Friedland and The Morning of Castiglione (unfinished). It represents Napoleon Bonaparte leading his troops during the grim retreat of the French Campaign of 1814. When the painting was sold in 1890, it reached a record price for a painting by a contemporary artist. It is currently housed in the Musée d'Orsay, Paris. According to the art historian Constance Hungerford, Meissonier's work reflects the somber realities of Napoleon's final military campaign, emphasizing themes of loss, resilience, and patriotism.

== Description ==
French Campaign, 1814 shows Napoleon Bonaparte riding a white horse, leading his troops on a cold, snowy road. The painting captures the hard and gloomy moments of Napoleon’s retreat during the French Campaign of 1814, when the forces of the Sixth Coalition advanced into France. Napoleon appears tired and thoughtful, his posture slightly slouched, and his clothing rumpled, reflecting the hardships of the campaign. His long overcoat is buttoned up, and his right hand rests near his chest in his familiar pose, symbolizing determination and duty. The dark, cloudy sky and the frozen, barren landscape amplify the sense of sadness and struggle. Napoleon’s grim expression conveys the heavy weight of his challenges, while his horse remains calm and noble, standing firm despite the harsh conditions. The art historian Constance Hungerford observes that this contrast between the weary man and the composed, powerful animal emphasizes Napoleon's humanity and vulnerability as a leader.

Meissonier utilized precise, detailed brushwork to depict both the physical environment and the psychological state of the figures in the campaign. The painting addresses themes of loss, physical endurance, and the consequences of warfare, and it is frequently cited by art historians as one of his most prominent works.

== Historical background ==
The French Campaign of 1814 marked a critical phase in Napoleon Bonaparte’s military career. After their victory at Leipzig in 1813, the Allied forces of the Sixth Coalition invaded France, vastly outnumbering Napoleon’s depleted army. Despite limited resources and war-weary troops, Napoleon achieved several victories at battles including Champaubert and Montmirail. However, these successes could not halt the Allies’ steady advance toward Paris. The campaign was devastating for France, with its countryside ravaged and its people demoralized. By March 1814, Paris fell, forcing Napoleon to abdicate.

This campaign marked the beginning of the end for the Napoleonic Empire. Although Napoleon briefly returned to power during the Hundred Days in 1815, culminating in his defeat at Waterloo, the events of 1814 served as a poignant reminder of the limits of his once-unrivaled dominance. French Campaign, 1814 immortalizes this moment, balancing the glory and tragedy of Napoleon’s final years as a leader.

== Artistic process ==
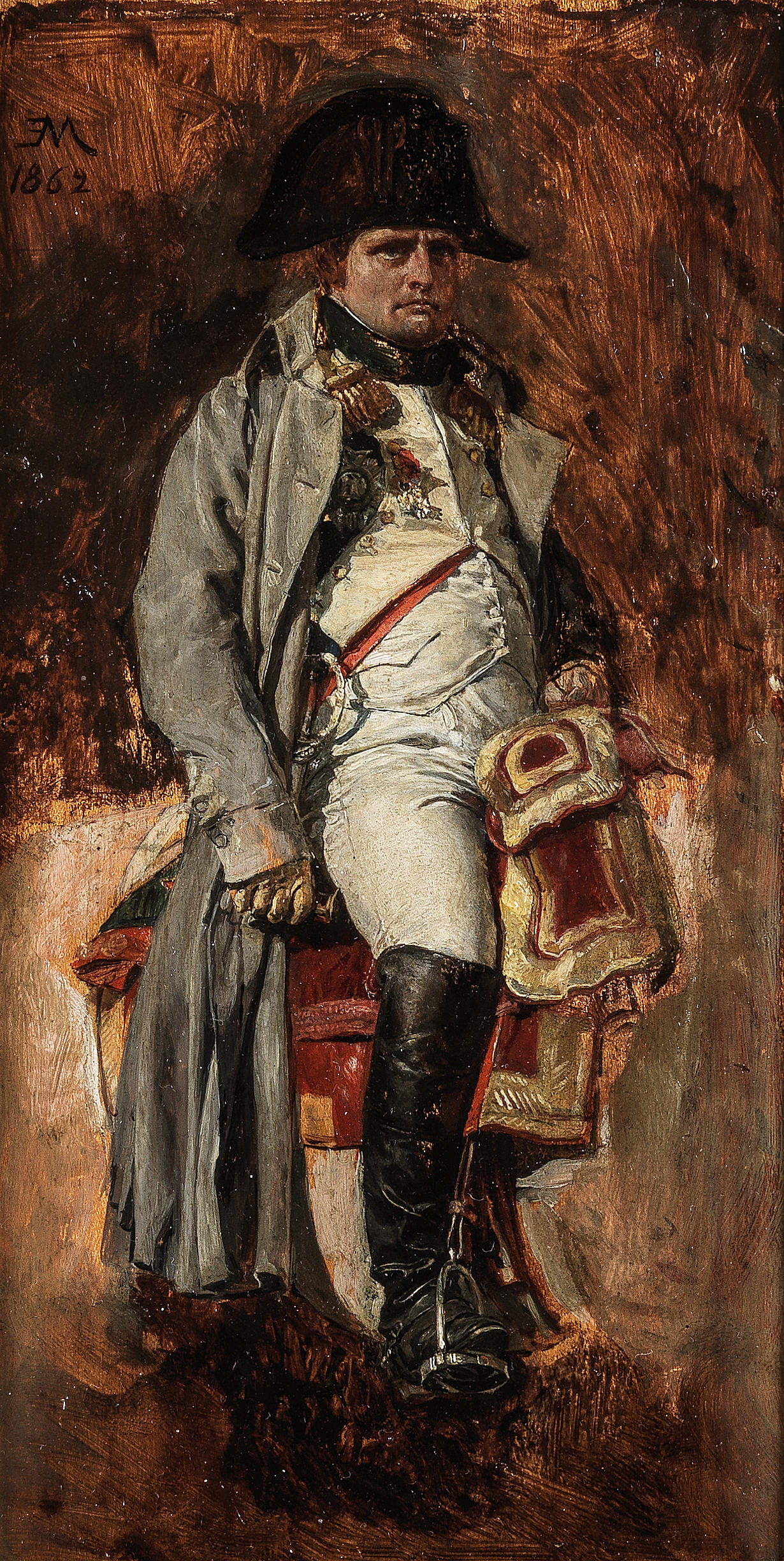
Study for The French Campaign.

To achieve a realistic portrayal of Napoleon, Meissonier went to great lengths. He borrowed Napoleon’s actual saddle from Prince Napoléon-Jérôme Bonaparte to ensure that every detail of the equipment was historically accurate. Furthermore, Meissonier had a replica of Napoleon’s overcoat made, which he wore himself while modeling for the painting in front of a mirror.

Meissonier's dedication extended to the depiction of the horse as well. Meissonier was particularly interested in portraying the correct gait and posture. According to art critic Duhousset, Meissonier was among the first to illustrate the appui diagonale gait, where diagonal pairs of a horse's legs move in unison with minimal knee flexion. This attention to equine movement was groundbreaking and added a layer of realism to his work.

== Critical reception ==
The criticism of French Campaign, 1814 was largely positive, with many praising Meissonier's ability to convey historical and emotional depth. Charles Clément remarked on the accuracy of the painting, particularly its equestrian elements, noting that Meissonier captured “the character and temperament of each horse.” Théophile Gautier hailed the work for its individuality, asserting that it owed “nothing to tradition” and stood as a bold departure from conventional historical painting. The painting’s intimate scale and precise execution were widely admired for their ability to evoke a sense of closeness to the subject. Albert Wolff declared it "one of the most powerful pictorial dramas of the century," emphasizing its emotional resonance and technical mastery.

However, not all critics were as enthusiastic. Jules Castagnary dismissed Meissonier's paintings as overly meticulous, likening them to “colored photographs,” a sentiment echoed by other detractors who felt the artist's attention to minute detail came at the expense of grandeur and artistic imagination. The painting’s small size also drew criticism, especially when compared to the monumental canvases of Delacroix and other contemporaries. Some critics viewed the emotional weight of the work as overshadowed by its technical precision, leading to accusations that it lacked the sweeping drama expected of historical masterpieces. This divide between admiration for Meissonier’s skill and skepticism about his artistic choices underscored the ambivalence that some felt toward his work.

== Provenance ==
After it was exhibited at the Salon of 1864, the painting was purchased in 1866 by the banker Gustave Delahante for 85,000 francs. Sold by Delahante to an anonymous dealer in 1890 (known by his initials MB) for 500,000 francs, the painting was then resold to Alfred Chauchard for 850,000 francs, the highest price at the time for a painting by a living artist. Bequeathed by Chauchard to the Louvre, it entered its collections in 1909. In 1986, the work was assigned to the Musée d'Orsay, where its still held.
