= The Oath of Henri de Guise =

Painting by Pierre-Charles Comte

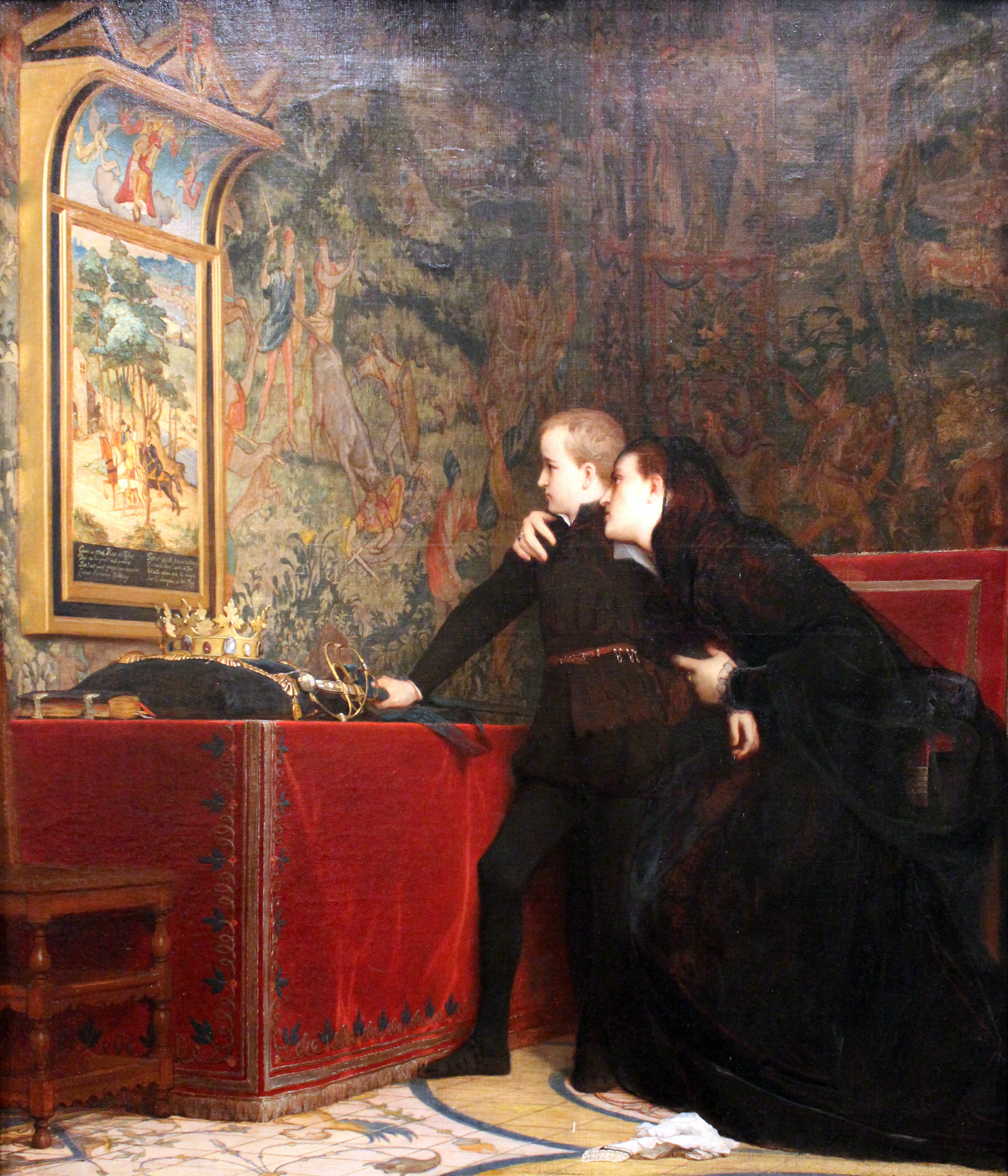
The Oath of Henri de Guise (1864) by Pierre-Charles Comte

The Oath of Henri de Guise is an 1864 history painting by Pierre-Charles Comte, now in the Château de Blois. The painting was displayed at the Salon of 1864. It formed part of the 2014 exhibition L'invention du passé. Histoires de cœur et d'épée en Europe, 1802-1850. It shows Henry I, Duke of Guise as a child.
