= Portrait of Mademoiselle L.L. =

Painting by James Tissot

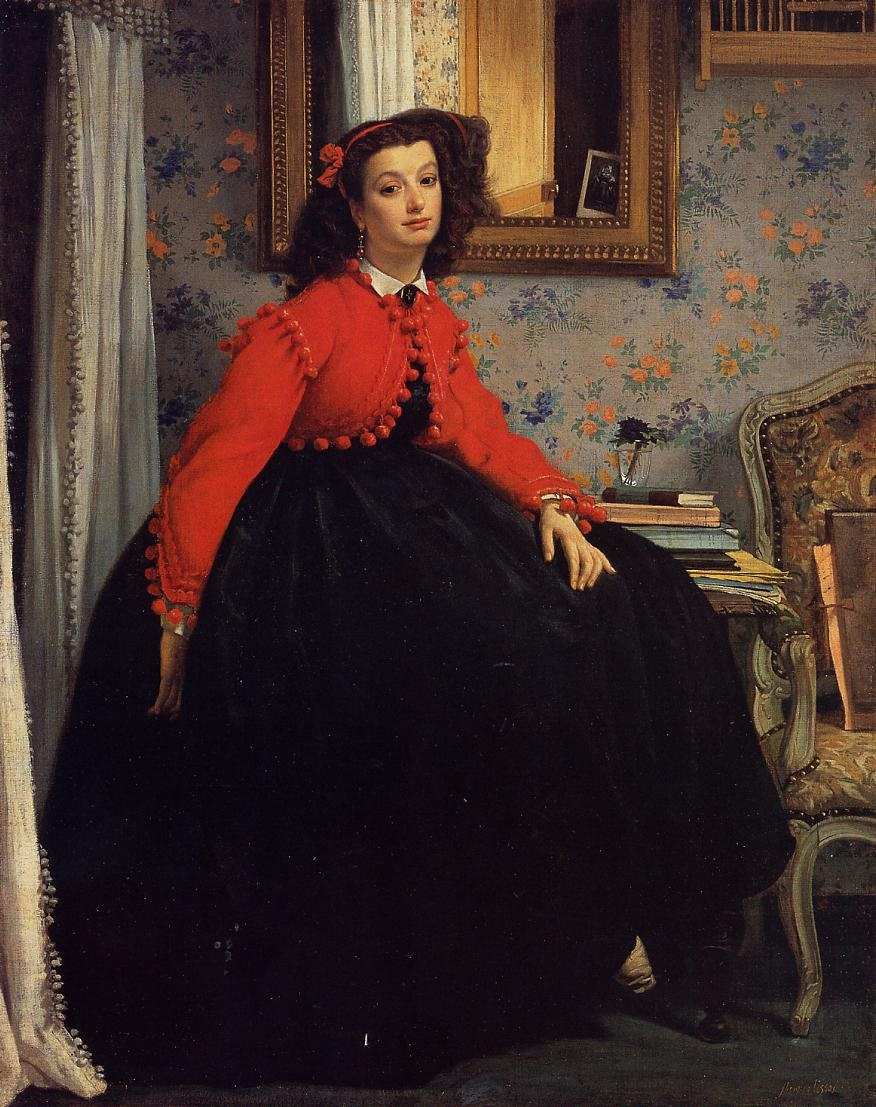
- Artist: James Tissot
- Year: 1864
- Type: Oil on canvas, portrait painting
- Dimensions: 124 cm × 99.5 cm (49 in × 39.2 in)
- Location: Musée d'Orsay, Paris

Portrait of Mademoiselle L.L. (French: Portrait de Mademoiselle L.L.) is an oil painting on canvas by the French artist James Tissot, from 1864. It depicts a young woman wearing a red bolero jacket seated on a small table. The initials in the title are now a mystery although the women had modelled for Tissot before.

It was one of two works that Tissot submitted to the Salon of 1864 along with The Two Sisters, which featured the same model who appeared in this picture. Today the painting is in the collection of the Musée d'Orsay in Paris having been acquired by the French state in 1907.

== Bibliography ==
- Marshall, Nancy Rose & Warner, Malcolm. James Tissot: Victorian Life, Modern Love. Yale University Press, 1999.
