= Georges Labit Museum =

Museum in Toulouse, France

Coordinates: 43°35′28″N 1°27′30.5″E

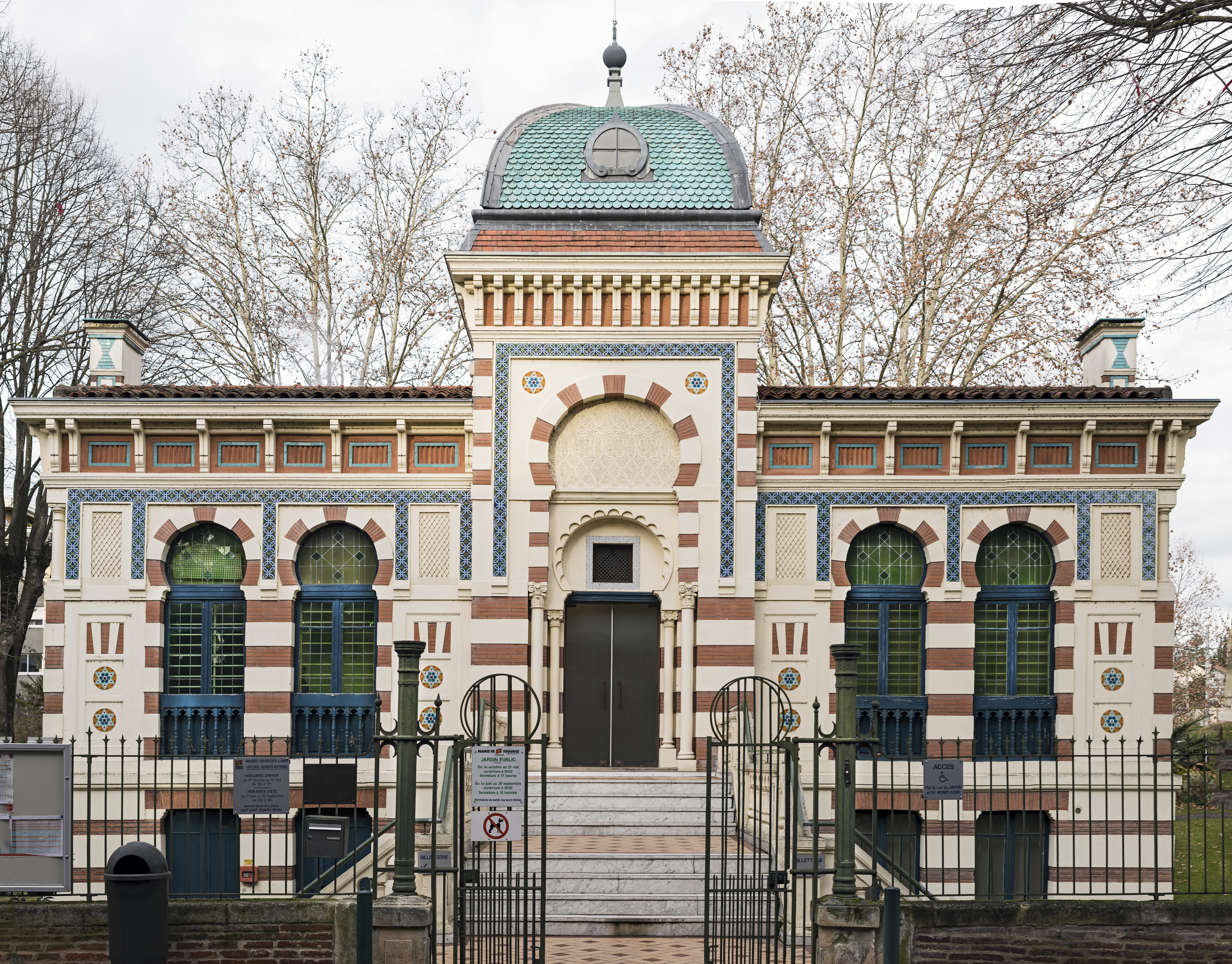
Georges Labit Museum

The Georges Labit Museum (French: Musée Georges Labit) (founded in 1893) is an archaeological museum located in Toulouse, France. It is dedicated to artifacts from the Far-Eastern and Ancient Egyptian civilizations.

The museum was founded by Georges Labit (1862–1899), a passionate amateur who travelled the world in search of ancient art and artifacts. It is housed in a Moorish villa erected by Toulousian architect Jules Calbayrac. The complex also contains an exotic garden, a specialist library, and a screening room.

The facades and roofs of the museum and the concierge, the garden, as well as the enclosing wall and the four gates, is partially registered as historical monuments on December 14, 2021.
