= Adelaide Lawson =

American painter

- Born: June 9, 1889; New York City
- Died: October 28, 1986 (aged 97); Huntington, Long Island, New York

Adelaide Lawson (June 9, 1889 – October 28, 1986) was an American artist known for her modernist oil paintings of landscapes and figures. She was said to possess an ability to build surface harmony through the use of flat, shadowless forms of generalized color and to use distortion and silhouetted patterning so as to give observers a sense of animation and often amusement.

== Art training ==
During the second decade of the twentieth century, Lawson studied at the Art Students League of New York under Kenneth Hayes Miller. Along with other students of Miller, she later studied under Hamilton Easter Field at his Ogunquit School of Painting and Sculpture in Ogunquit, Maine.

== Artistic career ==
Lawson's first public exhibition was in New York at the MacDowell Club in November 1916. A year later her name first appeared in issues of the American Art Directory and in 1918 her work appeared in three group shows: in March she showed at the Art Alliance of America, of which she was a member, (Note: The Art Alliance of America was founded in 1914 to help illustrators, designers, and craftsmen connect with advertising agencies, publishers, and other businesses that purchased art products. It also held regular exhibitions of work by painters, sculptors, and print makers. Mrs. Ripley Hitchcock helped to form the Alliance out of the Art Workers Club for Women and the Vocational League, both of which she had created in the years before 1914. In 1921 she helped bring into existence the Art Center which was both an organization and a building on East 56th Street. The Art Alliance of America and other organizations representing graphic artists, craftsmen, illustrators, and professional photographers moved into the Art Center building and they remained there until the early 1930s, when the Art Center, Alliance, and other organizations were merged into the National Alliance of Art and Industry.) and in December she appeared for a second time at the MacDowell Club and, once again, at the Art Alliance. (Note: She attracted notice for a painting called "Country Road" at the MacDowell Club. The Art Alliance show was for benefit of the Serbian Aid Fund. The Serbian Aid Society provided relief for Serbian refugees and prisoners of war following the Serbian military collapse in 1915. Its American branch, founded in New York, was the Serbian Aid Fund. It existed for two years, 1916-1918.) A year later she was referred to as a "prominent painter" during a group exhibition that included her work. A critic pronounced the landscapes she contributed to that show as imaginative and decorative. (Note: "Nature," this anonymous critic wrote, "with Miss Lawson but furnishes the theme upon which her fancy plays.") During the 1920s she exhibited frequently, appearing in group shows at the Touchstone and Powell Galleries (1921), the gallery of Louise Upton Brumback (1923), the Twelfth Street Gallery (1923), the G.R.D. Studio (1929), the Art Students' League (1929), and the Brooklyn Society of Modern Artists (1929).

In 1922 Lawson contributed a painting to a group exhibition held at a high school art studio in Washington, D.C. Because the show had been organized by African Americans, was located in a segregated school, and consisted largely of African American participants, Lawson's name has appeared in lists of African American artists. (Note: In citing her as an African American artist the Bio-Bibliographical Dictionary of Afro-American Artists lists as sources: Saylor, Gregory. "Adelaide Lawson," Art Review, April 1922, p. 24; Harley, Ralph Jr. "Checklist of Afro-American Art & Artists," The Serif, Dec. 1970. and, citing the Bio-bibliographical Dictionary, other reference sources have tentatively listed Lawson as an African American artist.) (Note: The exhibition was the first to be held by the newly founded Tanner Art League of Washington. Named in honor of the African American artist, Henry Ossawa Tanner, it included "oils, water colors, etchings and sculpture by colored art workers from a number of large cities.") Lawson was not African American but supported the rights of African Americans and participated in the New Negro movement of her time. (Note: In 1921 Lawson helped prepare for a formal ball held by the Westchester Negro League as an annual celebration of the Lincoln-Douglas debates of 1858. The Westchester Negro League was founded in the early years of the twentieth century by African Americans who were registered voters. The celebration was held on or near the anniversary of Lincoln's birth.) In 1923 her work appeared for the first time at the Whitney Studio Club (Note: The Whitney Studio Club was a project of the collector, sculptor, and philanthropist Gertrude Vanderbilt Whitney. With the goal of supporting them, she both purchased and publicly displayed the work of living American artists. Beginning in 1907, she used her own studio as a public gallery and in 1918 opened the Whitney Studio Club gallery on West 4th Street in Greenwich Village. In 1931 she and her husband expanded the gallery into the Whitney Museum of American Art. In 1925 a critic for the Christian Science Monitor wrote that "The inhabitants of the Village are fortunate in the Whitney Studio Club, where they may foregather when the freelance exhibitions are on. Most of them will try anything once and if sufficient encouragement leads to amplification they eventually exhibit uptown. A friendly, family spirit of tolerance surrounds their 'first, fine, careless' raptures.") in a show that also included paintings by John Dos Passos and sculptures by Reuben Nakian. Dos Passos, who was a close friend of Lawson's, had taken classes with her at the Art Students' League and Field's Thurnscoe School of Modern Art in Ogunquit, Maine. (Note: Dos Passos had met Lawson's brother, John Howard Lawson, in 1916 while they were sailing to France where both would serve as American Red Cross ambulance drivers. In 1920 he met Lawson while she and John Howard's wife, Kate Drain Lawson, were traveling in Spain. A biographer of Dos Passos records comments that Lawson made about their close relationship and the possibility that they might get married: "It occurred to me once or twice, too, and we were fond of each other, but never lovers. He was a wonderful escort and had many women friends. Ours was an easy relationship all our lives, and we never fell out. Even after I married Wood Gaylor, Dos was always dropping by and leaving his sketches and watercolors with me. Most of them he never reclaimed.") A critic noted that one of the landscapes she showed was fanciful and another quite sombre. In 1924 and 1925 Lawson showed twice more with Dos Passos at the Whitney Studio Club. Regarding the 1925 show, a critic called Lawson's paintings strange and unpleasantly eccentric. (Note: This critic, writing in the Christian Science Monitor, wrote that "Adelaide J. Lawson exhibits strange versions of people and places, which have little to commend them even on the score of eccentricity; there is nothing to be gained by representing Venetian waterways with gondolas like huge floating sausages.")

In the early 1920s Lawson participated in shows of the Society of Independent Artists, and when Hamilton Easter Field broke away from that organization to found the Salons of America, she not only joined it but became one of its directors. (Note: Field wholly endorsed the "no prizes, no juries" policy of the Society of Independent Artists but, believing the society favored some of its artists over others, started the Salons to assure that every member would have equal opportunity to be seen by the public. To this end, its exhibitions were hung in alphabetical order by artist surname. Field having died soon after its formation, Wood Gaylor, whom Lawson would marry in 1926, became its president.) In 1926 she became a founding member of the New York Society of Women Artists and afterwards regularly participated in its exhibitions. (Note: The New York Society of Women Artists was founded in 1926 as an alternative to the National Association of Women Painters and Sculptors (which was believed to be too traditional and academic). It aimed to show art that was innovative and not overly feminine. Membership was limited to thirty and each member was allotted the same amount of space in its exhibitions. Its first president was Marguerite Zorach. In addition to Lawson, the founding members included Agnes Weinrich, Anne Goldthwaite, Blanche Lazzell, Henrietta Shore, Louise Upton Brumback, Margaret Wendell Huntington, Marjorie Organ, and Sonia Gordon Brown.)

In 1925 Lawson was given her first solo as the inaugural exhibition of Gallery 134 on West 4th Street. In his review of the show, a critic for the New York Sun commented on the nonchalance of her work, showing a "sort of indifference to the things one usually finds in paintings". and said she painted "decidedly, with a fine detachment." The New York Evening Post's critic, Margaret Breuning, noted an unevenness in technical ability but praised the "power of design and concentration that gives vitality to all the canvases" and called attention to Lawson's sense of humor, which "gives back amusement to the beholder." A critic for the New York Sun wrote that her work stood out distinctly in a group show at G.R.D. Studio in 1929 and said, "She has a peculiarly loose way of painting that certainly approaches jazz. At first it seems lazy and shiftless, but it grows on acquaintance, and finally it is possible to suspect that there is something natively American in the style. (Note: The G.R.D. Studio was a non-commercial venture charging no commissions to the young artists whose work it showed. It was founded in 1928 as a memorial to the artist, Gladys Roosevelt Dick, by her sister, Mrs. Philip J. Roosevelt.)

During the 1930s and succeeding decades, Lawson's work appeared less frequently than it had in the 1920s. She and her husband and their two children left Manhattan to settle in a small community on Long Island's north shore, and, while she continued to paint, she participated only occasionally in public exhibitions.

When Lawson was 93, a critic summarized her life's work by describing the particular "vivacity, energy and dynamism" of her modernist style which set her apart from other artists and showed her uniquely American outlook. The critic described Lawson's method as "abstracting rhythms, simplifying descriptions, flattening, generalizing color, eliminating shadow and building an emphatic surface harmony between forms." Noting Lawson's exuberance and spontaneity, she wrote, "Occasionally viewers will associate the weightlessness of form with fantasy, innocence or naïveté. The intention, however, is to emphasize the power of direct landscape sensation." Four years later Lawson's obituary added to this overview that she and her husband had "spearheaded the modernist movement in the early years of this century."

== Exhibitions ==
Lawson's work appeared frequently in group shows held by the Whitney Studio Club, Society of Independent Artists, Salons of America, and New York Society of Women Artists. She was also shown by the Touchstone Gallery, Powell Art Gallery, the Twelfth Street Gallery, Pennsylvania Academy of Fine Arts, J. Wanamaker Gallery of Modern Decorative Art, and the Downtown and Midtown Galleries in New York. She appeared in special exhibitions at the G.R.D. Studio, Art Students' League, Brooklyn Society of Modern Artists, Louise Upton Brumback's gallery, by the Tanner Art League, and in Madrid, Spain. She is a standout at a 1929 G.R.D. Studio group exhibition alongside Mildred Crooks, Doris Rosenthal, and Agnes Weinrich. She was given solo exhibitions in 1925 at Gallery 134 in New York and the Lakewood Gallery, Glen Cove, Long Island. (Note: Sources for this list appear in the "Artistic career" section of this article. They also include a listing give by the web site of the Williams American Art Gallery.)

== Memberships ==
Lawson belonged to the Society of Independent Artists, Salons of America (as director), New York Society of Women Artists, Art Alliance of America, Hempstead Harbor Artists Association, and The Dialis. (Note: Sources for this list appear in the "Artistic career" section of this article. They also include a listing provided by the web site of the Williams American Art Gallery.)

== Personal information ==
Lawson's birth name is given as Adelaide Jaffery Lawson. She was born in New York on June 9, 1889. Her father was S. Levy Lawson. Born Simeon Levy, he had obtained a legal change of name to Simeon Levy Lawson shortly after Lawson's birth, and it is thus likely that her name at birth and for the next few months was Adelaide Jaffery Levy. (Note: Because Lawson was born a few months before the date of the court order that changed the family surname, her legal name may have been Adelaide Jaffery Levy at birth.) Simeon Levy's choice of name was influenced by his profession. A journalist who traveled frequently, he changed his name to overcome discrimination that he encountered on the assumption that he was a Jew. The new name he chose bore close similarity to the name of a well-known newspaperman, Edward Levy-Lawson, owner of the (London) Daily Telegraph. (Note: Edward Levy-Lawson reportedly added Lawson to his surname to accommodate a requirement in the will of an uncle, Lionel Lawson. His grandson, Jeffrey Lawson, said Simeon's goal was "to deny his Jewish background and become one with British and American culture," but he was discriminated against nonetheless because he "looked Jewish and had a thick Yiddish accent.") Lawson's mother was Belle Hart Lawson. Although Lawson's grandparents on her father's side were Russian-Polish Jews and those on her mother's were German Jews, her parents were Christian Scientists and, on that account, did not seek medical treatment when Belle contracted breast cancer. She died of the disease in November 1901 when Lawson was twelve years old. Lawson had two brothers, Wendell Holmes and John Howard. They were named after men whom their mother especially respected: the jurist, Oliver Wendell Holmes, and the prison reformer, John Howard. Wendell Lawson, who became a chemist and chemical importer, committed suicide at the age of 33 in 1922. (Note: Wendell (1887–1922), who had hoped to become a professional musician, found his success as a businessman deeply unsatisfying.) John Howard Lawson (1894–1977) was a playwright, screenwriter, and theatrical producer who joined the Communist Party during the 1930s and in 1950 was jailed for contempt of Congress after refusing to testify before the House Committee on Un-American Activities. Lawson's parents were affluent, her father through his success as a newspaperman and her mother as a daughter of a prosperous German industrialist and while both parents believed in social reform, her mother was particularly devoted to progressive causes, including women's rights and liberalized early childhood education.

Lawson received part of her early education in an experimental school, the Children's Playhouse, during a period in which her family was living in the New York suburb of New Rochelle. After her mother's death in 1901, Lawson's father, who traveled frequently and who, when present, was not a warm and loving parent, employed a governess and other servants to look after her and her brothers. That year he enrolled her and John Howard as boarding students at the Halstead School in Yonkers and, in the summer of 1906, when she was 17, he sent her with John Howard on an extensive tour of England, Germany, and the Netherlands. (Note: When Lawson and John Howard were sent to boarding school, Wendell was sent to study music in Germany and at the time of the two sibling's European travels he was embarking on a career as a chemical engineer.)

Reflecting the family's relatively high social position Lawson's name appeared in the society pages of New York newspapers during her teenage years. (Note: For example: When 14 she won a sailboat race at the Long Beach Yacht Club and a few years later she and her brother John returned home from a visit to an out-of-town friend. Early in 1909 the two of them were guests at a card party given for a bride-to-be and later the same year they visited a friend in Los Angeles while on a summer tour of the West Coast. She was recognized for charitable work aiding some of the city's neglected children.)

While young, Lawson lived in and around New York City. Lawson's father bought and sold real estate as an investment and the family moved frequently among properties that he owned. (Note: An example of Levy Lawson's real estate transactions is the listing of three buildings in Manhattan for sale in September 1895. At the time of the 1900 U.S. Census, they were in Brookhaven Township, Long Island, N.Y. Early in the 1900s they lived in New Rochelle, N.Y. In 1905 they lived on West End Avenue and in 1910 at an address on West 72nd Street in New York.) During the early stages of her career as a professional artist she lived in New York, first with her father, then, after her brother John's marriage, with him and his wife, and then on her own in an apartment on 14th Street near Union Square.

Lawson traveled in Germany, France, England, and Switzerland during 1908 In 1920 she visited France and Spain, and in 1921 she traveled in France, the British Isles, Switzerland, and Italy.

During the 1920s Lawson's contemporaries saw her as lovably gypsy-like and one maintained that she "had never been taught to wash her ears and neck." (Note: In an oral interview conducted in 1969, the artist Katherine Schmidt said, "The father had brought the three children up and Adelaide had never been taught to wash her ears and neck. But everybody who knew her loved her. She was just a wonderful human being. And free as a bird. Her father bought her a house on 41st Street. She was a great friend of Dos Passos.") Some critics of the time saw her paintings as similarly exotic, eccentric, nonchalant, and "curiously untidy."

Lawson married fellow artist Wood Gaylor on August 7, 1926. They had known each other for some years as students and participants in New York arts organizations. (Note: During the early 1920s Gaylor and Lawson came to know one another while taking classes at the Art Students League and while they were directors of Salons of America. She associated with the artists who informally joined together to form the Penguin Club, but, while welcome to help with annual fund-raising events, could not participate in their meetings or exhibitions. "Of course I could not go," she told a reporter in 1982. "They wouldn't have any females.") They remained married until Gaylor's death in 1957.

During the early years of their marriage, they lived in Greenwich Village. (Note: The 1930 U.S. Census report shows them living at 10 Van Ness Place. Van Ness Place was a name given to one block along Charles Street in Greenwich Village. It was located between West 4th and Bleecker Streets and was in existence from 1866 to 1936, when the name reverted to Charles Street.) Lawson and Gaylor had two sons, Wynn Lawson Gaylor, born circa 1927, and Randall, born circa 1930. Gaylor had a daughter by a previous marriage who lived with her mother. (Note: In 1909 Gaylor married Ruth E.M. Lorick. Born in Stockholm, she was also an artist. They had a daughter, Ruth Wood Gaylor, born circa 1911. Gaylor and Lorick divorced sometime between 1920 and 1926. In 1920 Gaylor, his wife Ruth, and their daughter were living in a boarding house run by his parents, in 1926 Gaylor married Lawson, and in 1930 mother and daughter were living in Manhattan (where Ruth, the mother, earned a living as an artist and took in a boarder to help pay the rent).) In 1930 their home comprised the three of them and a live-in servant. After spending summer vacations in Glenwood Landing for two years, they moved permanently to that Long Island village in 1934, and Lawson remained there following Gaylor's death in 1957. (Note: Glenwood Landing lies on the North Shore of Long Island near Oyster Bay and North Hempstead. Lawson later told an interviewer that the relocation helped her improve her outlook. The countryside, with its changing seasons, enabled her to produce more landscapes and to do more of her work directly from nature.) While continuing to pursue her artistic career, she participated in community activities from time to time. When she died at Huntington Hospital, Long Island, on October 28, 1986, the obituary writer for the New York Times gave her married name as "Gaylord."

Other names

Lawson sometimes used her middle initial, but not her middle name. Sources give this middle name as Jaffery, Jeffrey, Geoffery, or Jaffrey. Although she used Lawson as her professional name, her married name occurs in press reports as Adelaide Lawson Gaylord, Adelaide L. Gaylord, or simply Adelaide Gaylord.
