= Helena Dunlap =

American maritime painter (1876–1955)

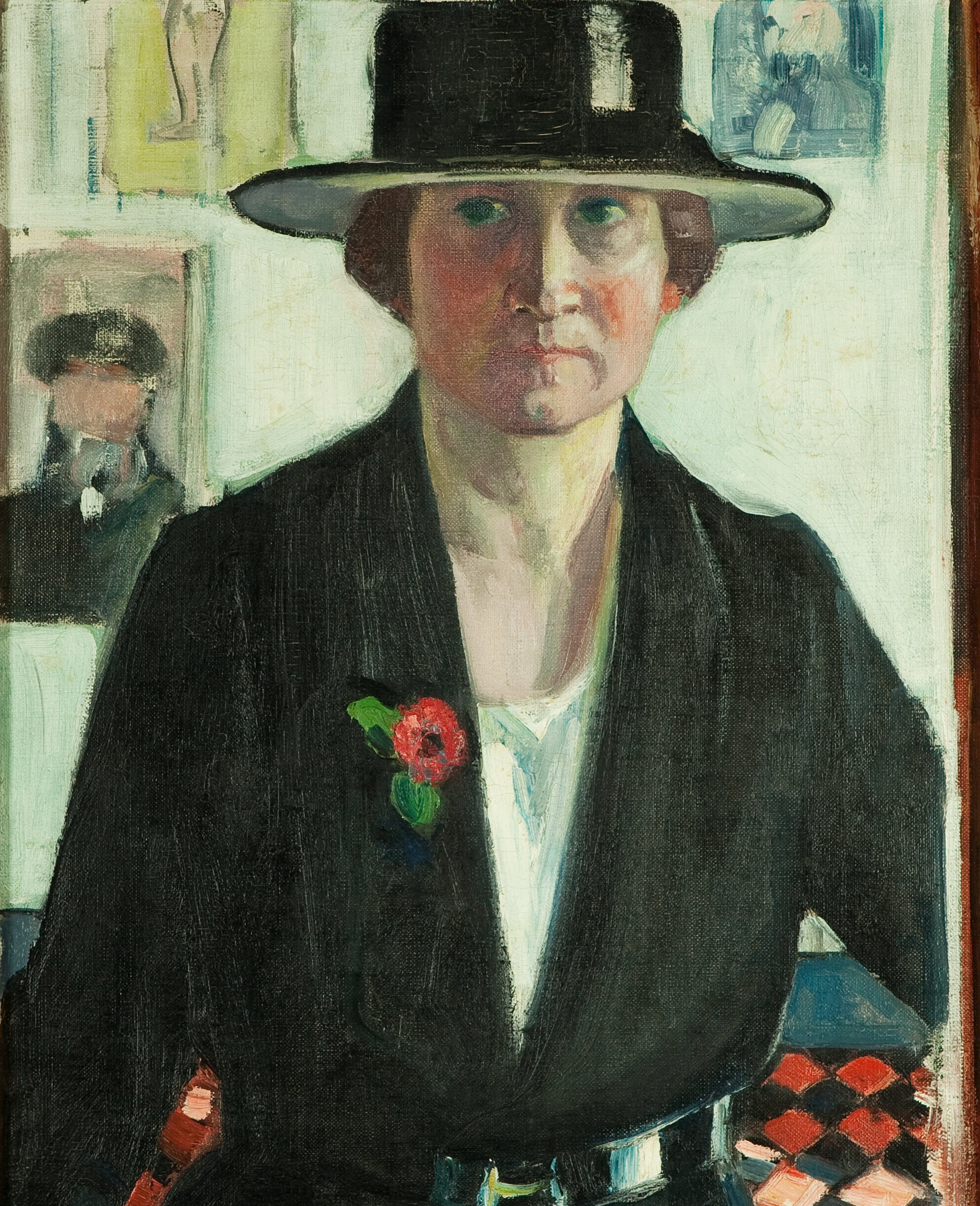
- self-portrait
- Born: October 9, 1876; Whittier
- Died: May 1, 1955 (aged 78); Whittier
- Resting place: Rose Hills Memorial Park
- Occupation: Painter

Helena Adele M. Dunlap (1876–1955) was an American modernist painter and artist. She was a founder in 1916 of the Los Angeles Modern Art Society, one of the first modernist groups to form in the region.

== Biography ==
Helena Dunlap was born on a ranch in Whittier, California on October 9, 1876. She studied with William Merritt Chase (1849–1916) in New York City and André Lhote (1885–1962) in Paris, where she participated in several exhibitions. She also studied at Pennsylvania Academy of the Fine Arts around 1903 to 1905. Local press praised Dunlap's avant garde style, which also has roots in Impressionism.

Dunlap was an early member of the California Art Club, first exhibiting with the CAC in their 2nd Annual Exhibition held November 22 – December 6, 1911 at Blanchard Hall, Los Angeles; she had joined with about thirty members, including eight other women: Helma Heynsen Jahn (1874–1925), Mary Ann Van Alstine Bartow (1848–1924), Alma May Cook (1884–1973), S. Henrietta Dorn Housh (1855–1919), Helen Hutchinson (born 1866), Louise Elizabeth Garden MacLeod (1857–1944), Lydie G. Price, and Elizabeth Waggoner. In 1915, she submitted a figurative picture instead of landscapes at the Panama-Pacific International Exposition in San Francisco. Around that time, she also had an individual show at the Los Angeles Museum.

Dunlap founded the Modern Art Society of Los Angeles in 1916 with five other CAC members: Bert Cressey (1883–1944), Meta Cressey (1882–1964), Edgar Keller (1868–1932), Henrietta Shore (1880–1963) and Karl Yens (1868–1945). Undoubtedly influenced by The Eight (Ashcan School) show in New York City, The Los Angeles Modern Art Society sought to give additional exposure to more experimental artists outside the juried shows of the California Art Club.

Dunlap was close to Doris Patty Rosenthal. They traveled in 1917 to Taos, New Mexico, where they briefly resided and exhibited alongside leading American painters George Bellows, Robert Henri and others in the inaugural exhibition in Santa Fe's new Fine Arts Museum.

In 1919 Dunlap participated in art shows with Caroline Bowles, Henrietta Shore, William Cahill, Edouard Vsykal and Luvena Buchanan under the name California Progressive Group. Dunlap travelled to Mexico in 1927 with fellow artist Shore, who had gone on the urging of photographer Edward Weston. The year after, Dunlap moved to northern California, leaving behind the studio she and Shore had shared. She also lived in Paris and in the 1950s, moved to Laguna Beach, California.

Dunlap died at her home in Whittier on May 1, 1955, and was buried at Rose Hills Memorial Park.
