= Mildred Lucile Crooks =

American painter

- Born: December 12, 1899; Chicago
- Died: May 1972; New York, NY
- Known for: painting
- Style: abstract expressionist
- Movement: New York School
- Spouse: Pinckney Gibson Daves (m. 1901)

Signature
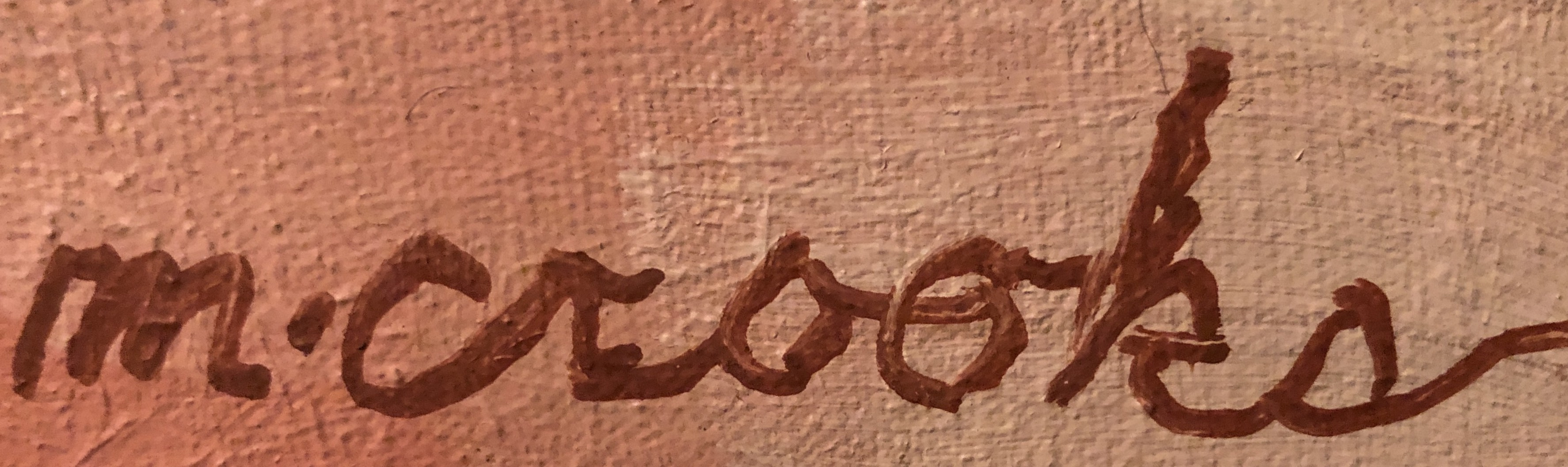

Mildred Lucile Crooks (December 12, 1899 – May , 1972) was an American abstract expressionist painter. She studied in Paris, France and exhibited at many group and solo shows including at the Pennsylvania Academy of Fine Arts, Salon des Tuileries, Salon d'Automne, the Brooklyn Museum, Arts Club Washington, D.C., and at many galleries in New York City.

== Personal life ==
Crooks was born in Chicago, Illinois, the daughter of Henry David Crooks. She graduated from Oak Park High School in Chicago, before moving to New York City and Paris. Crooks studied in France, residing with her brother, Harold Crooks. She married Pinckney Gibson Daves on June 21, 1929, at the First Presbyterian Church, New York. The couple lived in the Sutton Place neighborhood, but also frequented the East Hampton area often staying at the Conklin House or at their residence in the Georgica Settlement (now known as the Georgica Association). In the early 1930s, they were cited as guests at Francophile events in Cincinnati, Ohio. When Crooks died in May 1972, her death was recorded using her married name, Mildred Daves.

== Life in France ==
Mildred Crooks, "Children with Dog." c1932

Crooks studied in Paris for several years, reportedly having studios in Paris and Cannes. Her work was exhibited in the early 1930s at various salons including Salon D'Automne and Salon des Tuileries.

Crooks was the subject of a painting by Ary Stillman, a Russian American artist, who also spent time in Paris. His painting, Portrait of Mrs. Pinckney Daves, was exhibited in late 1931 at the "L'exposition Artistique la Plus Originale de L'Annee" at Salon des Echanges. A photograph of the Stillman exhibit featuring the painting is rare glimpse of her likeness.

== Critical reception ==
A number critics wrote about Crooks's work, including one featured article in The New York Times in 1932, where she is called a "painter's painter." The review of her still-life was deemed to have been "worked out with really fine detail," although the critic worries about her "forays into surrealist territory," a territory she embraced later in her career with her paintings becoming more abstract.

Another reviewer at The New Yorker can't decide if Crooks's nudes were the high-spot of the show, but claims to like them immensely. The art critic C. Adolph Glassgold reviewing her exhibition at the Morton Gallery states that Crooks's work shows "Impeccable color sense.."

== Exhibitions ==
Mildred Crooks had a thirty-five-year-long exhibition record. This list of known exhibitions of Crook's work uses sources from exhibition records, news accounts in The New York Times, the Washington Post, The New Yorker, and The New York Sun, Crooks's biography entry in AskArt, as well as entries in various arts magazines such as The Arts and Creative Art.

=== Exhibitions by year ===
- 1928: Anderson Galleries, New York (May 1928), Third annual exhibition of NY Society of Women Artists.
- 1929: G.R.D. Studio, New York, New York, (January 1929), four artists show featuring Mildred Crooks, Adelaide J. Lawson, Doris Rosenthal, and Agnes Weinrich.
- 1929: Anderson Galleries, New York (March 1929), exhibition of NY Society of Women Artists.
- 1931: Salon D'Automne, Paris, France. Fleurs (#426).
- 1932: Salon des Tuileries, 10th Exposition, Paris, France. Deux enfants (#439), Nature morte (#440).
- 1932: Morton Gallery, New York, New York (Jan. 4–18, 1932).
- 1932: Gallery of the NY Society of Women Painters and Sculptors, Squibb Building, New York (March 1932).
- 1933: Salon des Tuileries, 11th Exposition, Paris, France (1933, received an hors de concours for one of her works). Composition (#600), Nature morte (#601), Nature morte (#602).
- 1933: Gallerie Zak – Group show.
- 1934: Gallerie de Paris – Group show
- 1934: Salon des Tuileries, 12th Exposition, Paris, France. Composition (#516), Nature morte (#517), Nature morte (#518).
- 1936: NY Society of Women Artist Exhibition (January 1936).
- 1938: Arts Club, Washington D.C., (November 1938).
- 1939: New York World's Fair: Two murals on glass combined with photographs (30' x 15') executed for Paul Lester Weiner, architect, for the Brazilian pavilion; eight dioramas for the Ecuadorian pavilion.
- 1940: Semi-private Exhibition Studio of Paul Lester Wiener, Architect.
- 1941: Henry Art Gallery, University of Washington, Seattle, Washington. (July 7 – August 20, 1941)
- 1946: Pennsylvania Academy of the Fine Arts, Annual Exhibition 1946, January 26 – March 3; entry #285; Revelation XII:II
- 1953: Pachita Crespi Gallery of Creative Art, New York, New York – solo exhibition (October 15–29, 1953)
- 1957: Solo exhibition, Ruth White Gallery, New York, New York, March 5–30, 1957.
- 1957: Group show, Ruth White Gallery, New York, New York, May 1957.
- 1957: Holiday group show, Ruth White Gallery, New York, New York, December 1957.
- 1957: Willard Gallery, New York, New York, (May 1957)
- 1957: Emmerich Gallery, New York, New York (December 1957)
- 1959: Pioneer Museum and Haggin Galleries, Stockton, California (November – December 1959)
- 1960: Ruth White Galleries, New York, New York (April 26 – May 14, 1960, abstract landscapes)
- 1963: Ruth White Galleries, New York, New York, (April 23 – May 11, 1963).
