= Henrietta Shore =

Canadian-American painter

- Born: January 22, 1880; Toronto, Central Canada, US
- Died: May 17, 1963 (aged 83); San Jose, California, US
- Occupation: Artist

Henrietta Mary Shore (January 22, 1880 – May 17, 1963) was a Canadian-born artist who was a pioneer of modernism. She lived a large part of her life in the United States, most notably California.

== Early life ==
Shore was born in Toronto, Canada, to Henry and Charlotte Shore. She was the youngest of seven children. She was drawn to both painting and nature at a young age, remarking

"I was on my way home from school and saw myself reflected in a puddle. It was the first time I had seen my image completely surrounded by nature, and I suddenly had an overwhelming sense of belonging to it—of actually being part of every tree and flower. I was filled with a desire to tell what I felt through painting."

Shore's mother supported Shore's artistic ambitions, but advised her to learn practical matters as well. After taking a domestic education class, Shore began studying painting with the Canadian Impressionist Laura Muntz Lyall at the age of fifteen. Her works at this time are mostly genre scenes and thus conform to subject matter that would have been popular in Toronto's traditional art scene during the period.

== Toronto, Europe, and New York: 1900–1913 ==
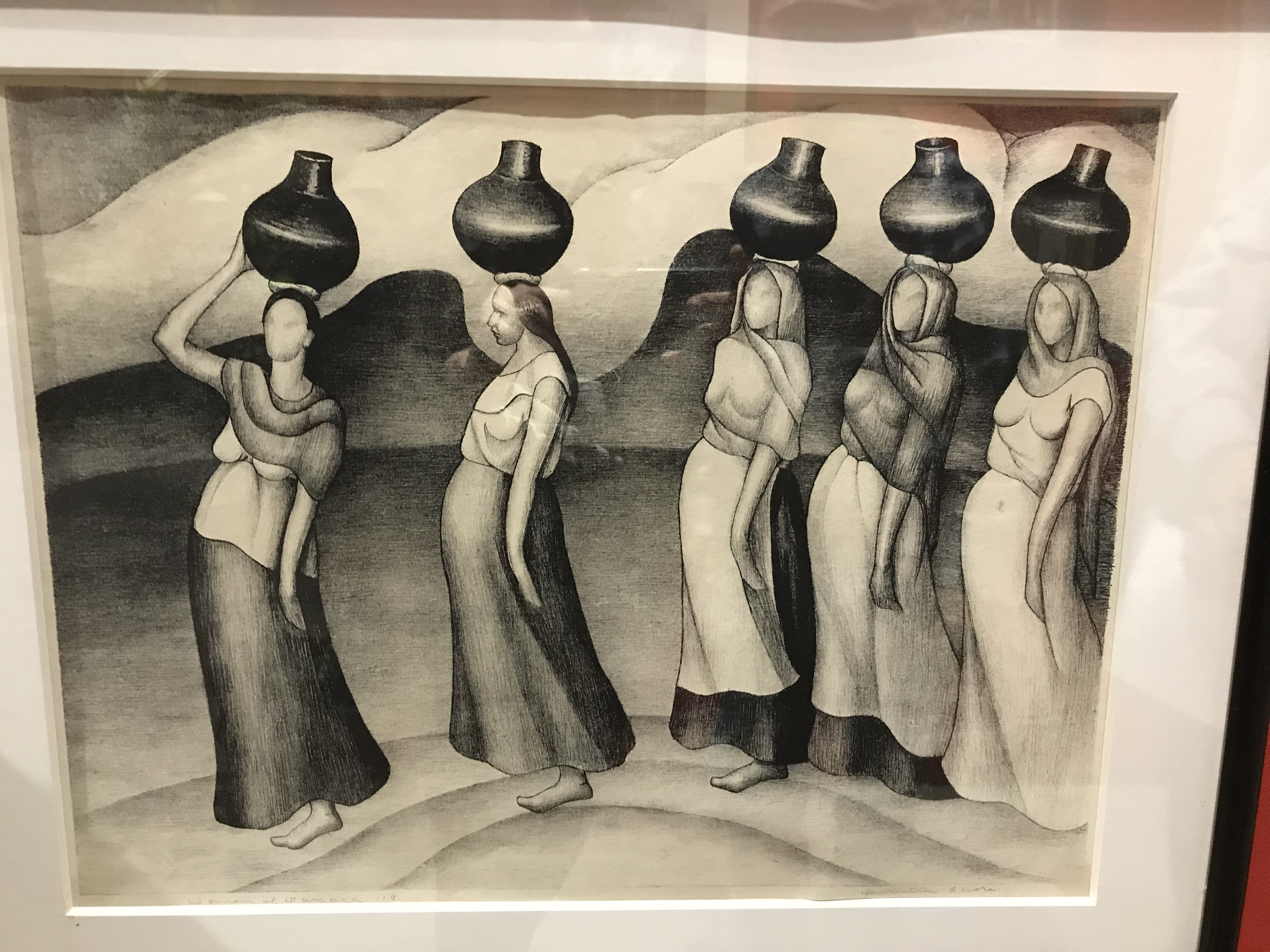
Women of Oaxaca circa 1928 by Henrietta Shore.

Between 1900 and 1913, Shore travelled back and forth between Toronto, Europe and New York. It was during this period that she enrolled in the New York School of Art and studied under William Merritt Chase and Robert Henri, often spending half the year in New York. Henri's Ash Can School aesthetic influenced Shore's work during this time. His impact can be seen in subject matter and in looser, more painterly works, such as Negro Women and Children (1910–1915), in the collection of the National Gallery of Canada. During this time Shore established a reputation within the Canadian art community as a promising young painter. She taught classes, had solo shows at galleries in Toronto and showed in group exhibitions in Paris, London, and Liverpool.

== Los Angeles: 1913–1920 ==
In 1913, Shore moved from Toronto to Southern California, settling in Los Angeles and becoming part of a small but influential group of early West Coast modernists. She quickly found success, winning silver medals at the Panama–California Exposition in 1914 and 1915 in San Diego. Shore also showed work in juried exhibitions of the California Art Club to positive reviews. One 1916 review published in the Fine Arts Journal grouped her under the label of "the modernists" and declared her one of the best artists of the group among those who studied with Robert Henri. Of her work the reviewer comments, "Miss Shore tempers her pigment with intelligence and understanding, and brings to her work an acute knowledge of psychology as well as sound technique, a thorough art training and a rare artistic perception. Her exceptional canvas, called "Mother and Child," is unquestionably one of the real gems of the exhibition."

In 1916, Shore was a founding member of The Los Angeles Modern Art Society along with Bert Cressey, Meta Cressey, Helena Dunlap, Edgar Kellar and Karl Yens. Undoubtedly influenced by The Eight (Ashcan School) show in New York City, The Los Angeles Modern Art Society sought to give additional exposure to more experimental artists outside the juried shows of the California Art Club. The group's first show was held in the gallery of the Brack Shops. They held their second exhibition the following year in 1918. This show also included works from prominent East Coast artists such as Robert Henri, George Bellows, Maurice Prendergast and William Glackens. The Los Angeles Modern Art Society was short-lived, disbanding soon after their second show. Throughout the whole process, Shore remained close to her mentor, Henri, through letters. After the disbandment of the group, Henri consoled her, writing, "perhaps it is good that Societys die young while they are yet virtuous and useful. Some of the old ones have hung on long after those conditions and they stand as horrible examples." In 1919, Shore began showing with Caroline Bowles, Helena Dunlap, William Cahill, Edouard Vsykal, and Luvena Buchanan under the name California Progressive Group.

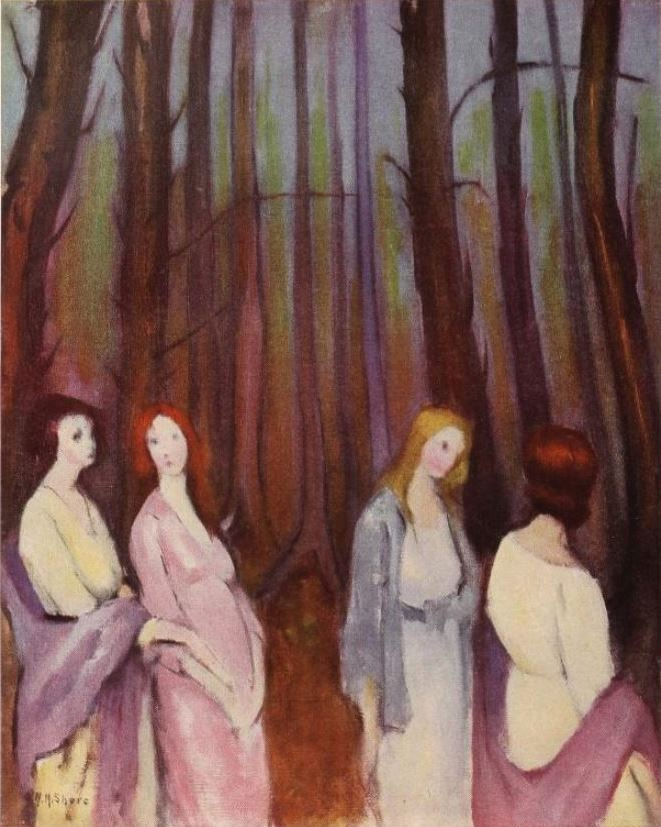
"Among the Trees", published in the July 1923 Shadowland

== New York City and return to Los Angeles: 1920–1926 ==
In 1920, Shore moved to New York, working in a studio on West 57th Street. During this time her work changed radically, morphing from painterly scenes of everyday life to colorful, close-up abstractions. It has been suggested that the change in style may have been a result of exposure to other modernists working in New York during the time, such as Arthur Dove, Charles Demuth, and Georgia O'Keeffe. In 1923, Shore and O'Keeffe showed in the same month, Shore at Ehrich Gallery and O'Keeffe at the Anderson Galleries. Critics reviewed both shows together, attributing the similarities in their works (both abstracted nature scenes) to a female sensibility. Their works were framed by their gender, said to showcase "smothered passion" and "dark destiny or original sin." The reduction of her work to her gender deeply bothered Shore who intended to express metaphysical themes through incorporating Eastern philosophy and Theosophy. In 1923, Shore returned to Los Angeles where she continued to work and exhibit. She opened a gallery/restaurant called Studio Inn in 1925.

== Meeting Edward Weston and Mexico: 1927–1930 ==
In 1927, Shore was introduced to photographer Edward Weston. Weston was struck by his first encounter with Shore's work, saying "Shore now realizes a fusion of her own ego with a deep universality...When she paints a flower she IS that flower." They quickly became close friends. Her paintings of sea shells attracted and influenced him and he borrowed some of her shells for his photographs. Shore was his senior, 47 to his 40, and at that time a much more established artist. On Weston's urging, Shore travelled to Mexico with her friend and fellow artist Helena Dunlap. It was in Mexico that she was introduced to lithography, a medium which she continued to work in upon her return to California. Her stay in Mexico most certainly influenced Shore's work, as can be seen in paintings like Women of Oaxaca in which a line of women in traditional Tehuantepec clothing carry black water jars on their heads.

== Carmel: 1928–1950 ==
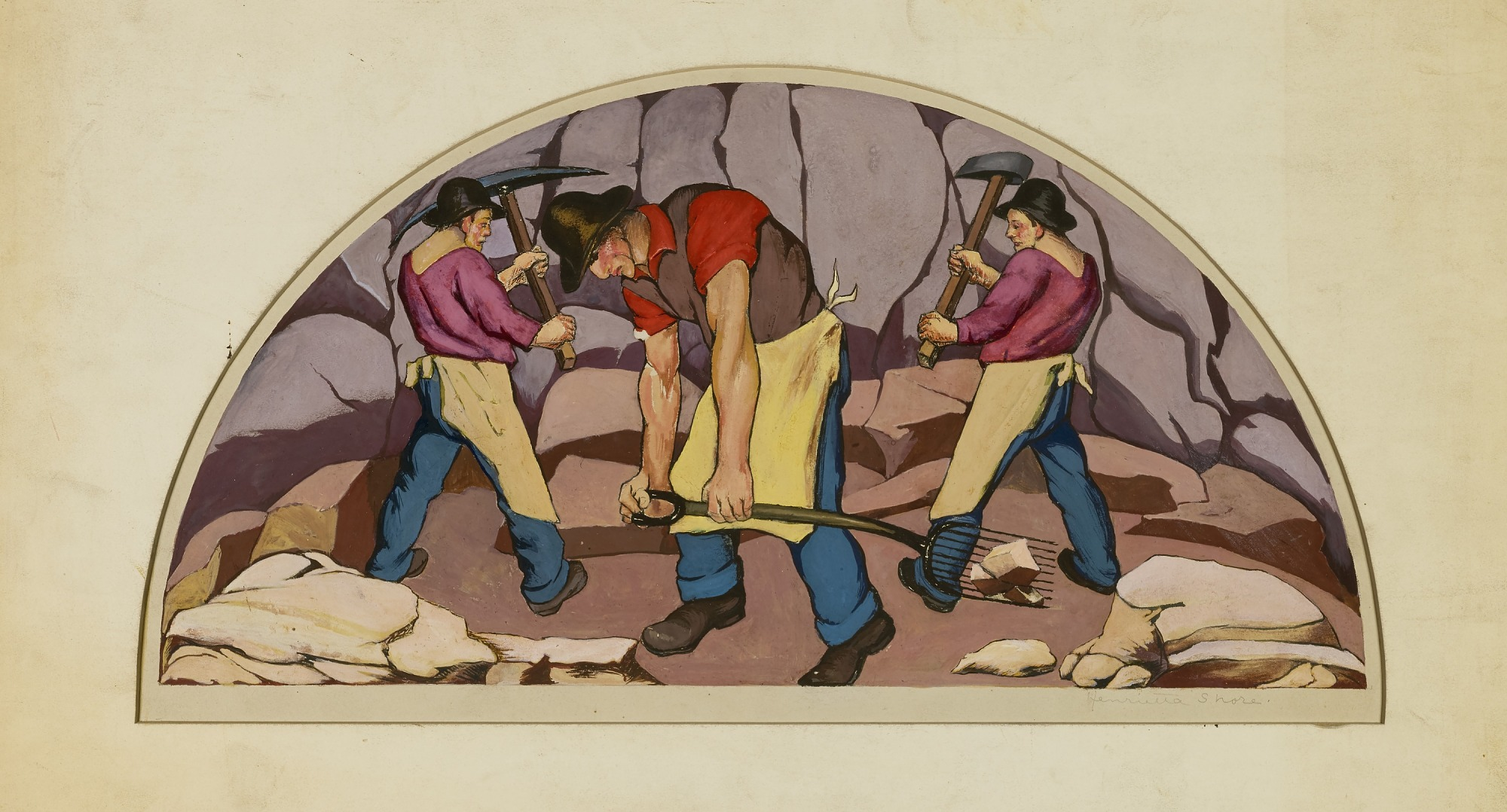
Study for Limestone Quarry Industry

Shore moved to Carmel-by-the-Sea, California in the late 1920s, then an important art colony and resort, following in the footsteps of Weston. The natural beauty of Carmel provided Shore with ample painting inspiration. During the summer of 1928, the Johan Hagemeyer Studio-Gallery in Carmel staged a solo exhibition of Shore's work, accompanied by a program of modern Norwegian music. A major retrospective of her paintings appeared in the fall of 1930 at Carmel's Denny-Watrous Gallery, which showed her art two years later at the "Portfolio Exhibition" and at the "Black & White Show" sponsored by the Carmel Art Association. In February 1934, she joined fellow Carmelite artists Stanley Wood and John O'Shea and donated her paintings to a sale of original art in support of the controversial Scottsboro Defense Fund, which was intended to free nine black men falsely accused of rape. That same year she exhibited local scenes at the Exhibition of Public Works of Art in Washington, D.C., and San Francisco. During this period she exhibited locally at the Legion of Honor and the de Young Museum. She also had shows in New York and Paris. Despite these shows, Shore struggled financially during the Depression and slipped into relative obscurity, just as Weston began to achieve fame. Like many artists during this time, Shore relied on government commissions for income. In 1936, she received a commission for six murals from the Treasury Department's Section of Painting and Sculpture. These murals, like many New Deal art commissions, focus on scenes of industry and work. Shore painted four lunettes for the Santa Cruz Post Office: Fishing Industry, Limestone Quarry Industry, Artichoke industry, and Brussel Sprouts Industry. She painted Artichoke Pickers in the Old Customhouse in Monterey and Monterey Bay 1880-1910 in the Monterey Post Office. These murals were her last prominent works.

== Later life and death 1950–1963 ==
Shore spent her last years in poverty. She had to sell her Weston photographs to survive and became increasingly depressed. In 1951, her studio was at the Sundial Lodge on Monte Verde Street and 7th Avenue, in Carmel. She once gave the lodge owner, Allen Knight, a painting as her rent payment.

Sometime in the late 1950s, her neighbours had her institutionalized. Her friend, Jehanne Bietry Salinger, said about the matter, "some so-called 'do-gooders' went to her studio, found it disorganized, and had Henrietta committed to an asylum. If I had been in Carmel, I would never have permitted it, since she was in no way insane. I still can not think about this without being heartbroken."

Shore died in 1963 at the age of 83 in a mental institution in San Jose, California.

== Legacy ==
Unlike Edward Weston and Georgia O'Keeffe, Henrietta Shore and her work mostly fell into obscurity after her death. A posthumous show of her work was organized by the Carmel Art Association. Her unsold work was divided between her surviving nephews, Osborne Shore Hollinrake and Wendall Shore. She was included in Origins of Abstraction in Canada: Modernist Pioneers organized by the Robert McLaughlin Gallery in Oshawa in 1994.

== Selected works ==
- Girl in Furs, c. 1908, National Gallery of Canada, oil on canvas, mounted on hardboard, 81.4 x 63.6 cm, Purchased 1997National Gallery of Canada (no. 39041)
- Women of Oaxaca, undated, lithograph on paper, MMA Acquisition purchase fund, 1978.272
- The Promenade, Centre Island, Toronto, c. 1911 oil on canvas, 44.4 cm × 76.7 cm (17.5 in × 30.2 in), Purchased 1997, National Gallery of Canada (no. 39040)
- Negro Woman and Two Children, c. 1916, oil on canvas, 137.8 x 113.6 cm, Purchased 1918, National Gallery of Canada (no. 1504)
- Gloxinia by the Sea, 1930-1935, oil on canvas, private collection
- The Artichoke Pickers, 1936-1937, California Department of Parks and Recreation

== Bibliography ==
- Murray, Joan (1994). Origins of Abstraction in Canada: Modernist Pioneers. Oshawa, Ontario: Robert McLaughlin Gallery.
