= Jean-Paul Laurens =

French painter and sculptor (1838–1921)

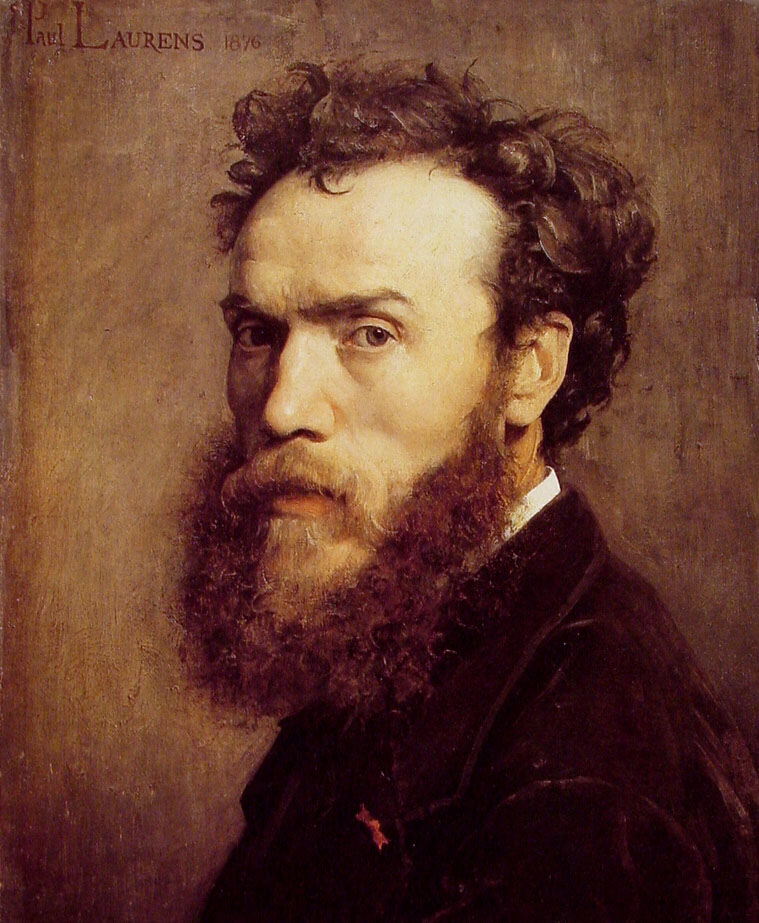
- Self-portrait (1876)
- Born: 28 March 1838; Fourquevaux, France
- Died: 23 March 1921 (aged 82); Paris, France
- Known for: History painting
- Movement: Academic art Romanticism

Jean-Paul Laurens (French pronunciation: [ʒɑ̃pol loʁɑ̃]; 28 March 1838 – 23 March 1921) was a romanticist French painter and sculptor, and he is one of the last major exponents of the French Academic style.

== Biography ==
Laurens was born in Fourquevaux and was a pupil of Léon Cogniet and Alexandre Bida. Strongly anti-clerical and republican, his work was often on historical and religious themes, through which he sought to convey a message of opposition to monarchical and clerical oppression. His erudition and technical mastery were much admired in his time, but in later years his highly realistic technique, coupled to a theatrical mise-en-scène, came to be regarded by some art-historians as overly didactic. More recently, however, his work has been re-evaluated as an important and original renewal of history painting, a genre of painting that was in decline during Laurens's lifetime.

Laurens was commissioned to paint numerous public works by the French Third Republic, including the steel vault of the Paris City Hall, the monumental series on the life of Saint Genevieve in the apse of the Panthéon, the decorated ceiling of the Odéon Theater, and the hall of distinguished citizens at the Toulouse capitol. He also provided illustrations for Augustin Thierry's Récits des temps mérovingiens ("Accounts of Merovingian Times").

He died in Paris, aged 82. Two of his sons, Paul Albert Laurens (1870–1934) and Jean-Pierre Laurens (1875–1932), both also became painters and teachers at the Académie Julian.

== Notable students ==
Laurens was highly respected teacher at the Académie Julian, Paris, and a professor at the École nationale supérieure des Beaux-Arts in Paris.

- Moussa Ayoub
- George Barbier
- Marjorie Bates
- Emilio Boggio
- Catharine Carter Critcher
- Cecilia Cutescu-Storck
- Angèle Delasalle
- Ludwig Deutsch
- André Dunoyer de Segonzac
- Georges Dufrénoy
- Sears Gallagher
- Phelan Gibb
- Kahlil Gibran
- Thomas Cooper Gotch
- Louise Herreshoff
- Christian Herter of Herter Brothers
- Will Hutchins
- A. Y. Jackson
- Gustave Louis Jaulmes
- Alfred Garth Jones
- Pyotr Konchalovsky
- Leon Kroll
- Mortimer Lichtenauer
- Angèle Delasalle
- Arturo Michelena
- Ella Ferris Pell
- Cristóbal Rojas
- Robert Poughéon
- Alexander Rummler
- Paul Sibra
- René Schützenberger
- William Somerville Shanks
- Aurélia de Souza
- Sofia Martins de Sousa
- Henry Scott Tuke
- Karl Yens
- John Goodwin Lyman

== Gallery ==
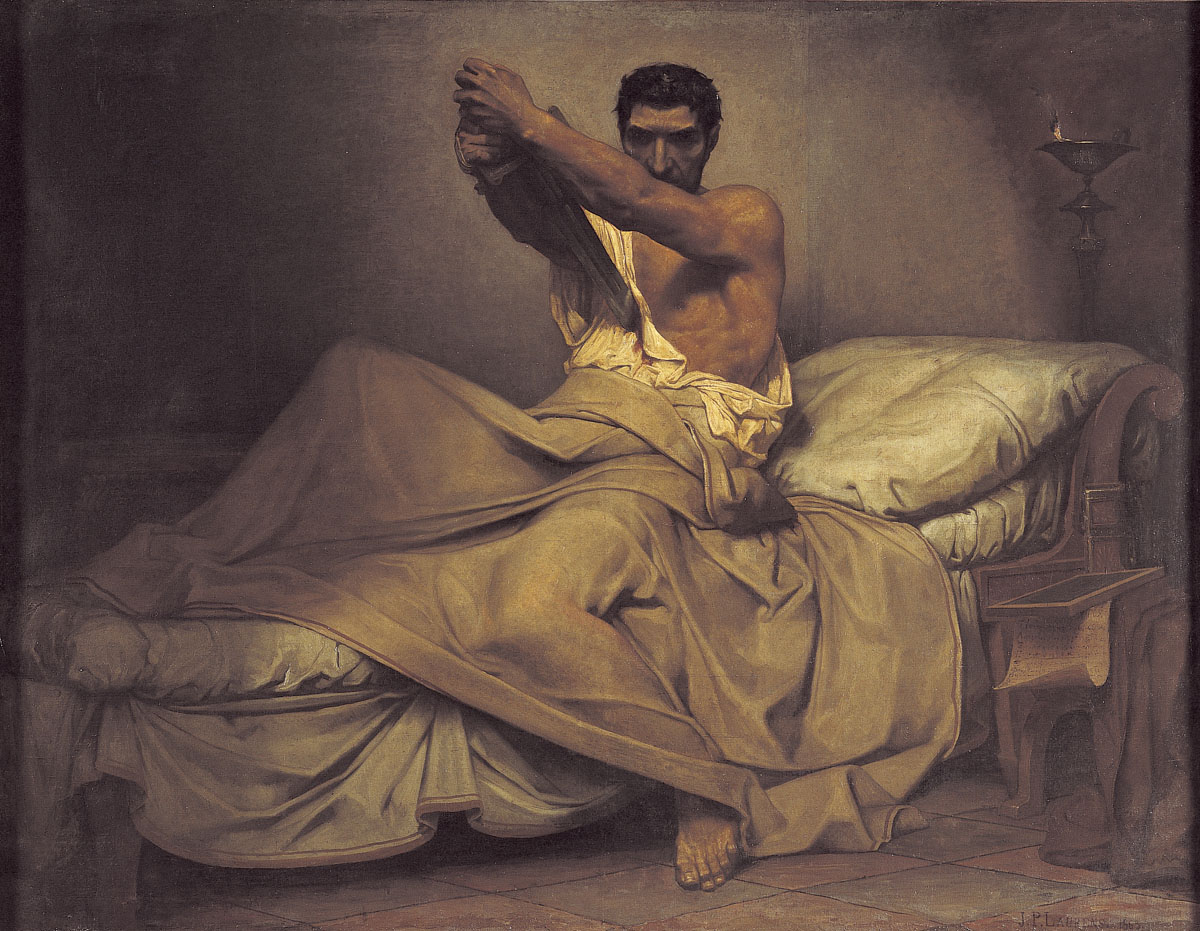
Cato's Death at Utica, 1863

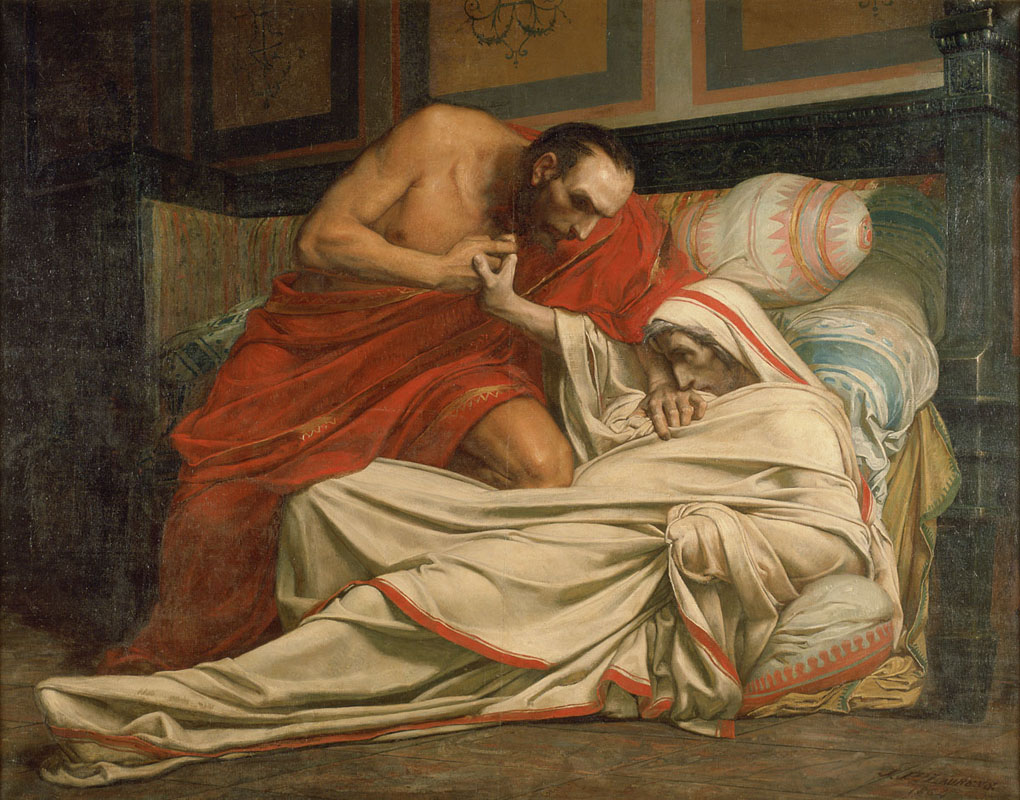
The Death of Tiberius, 1864

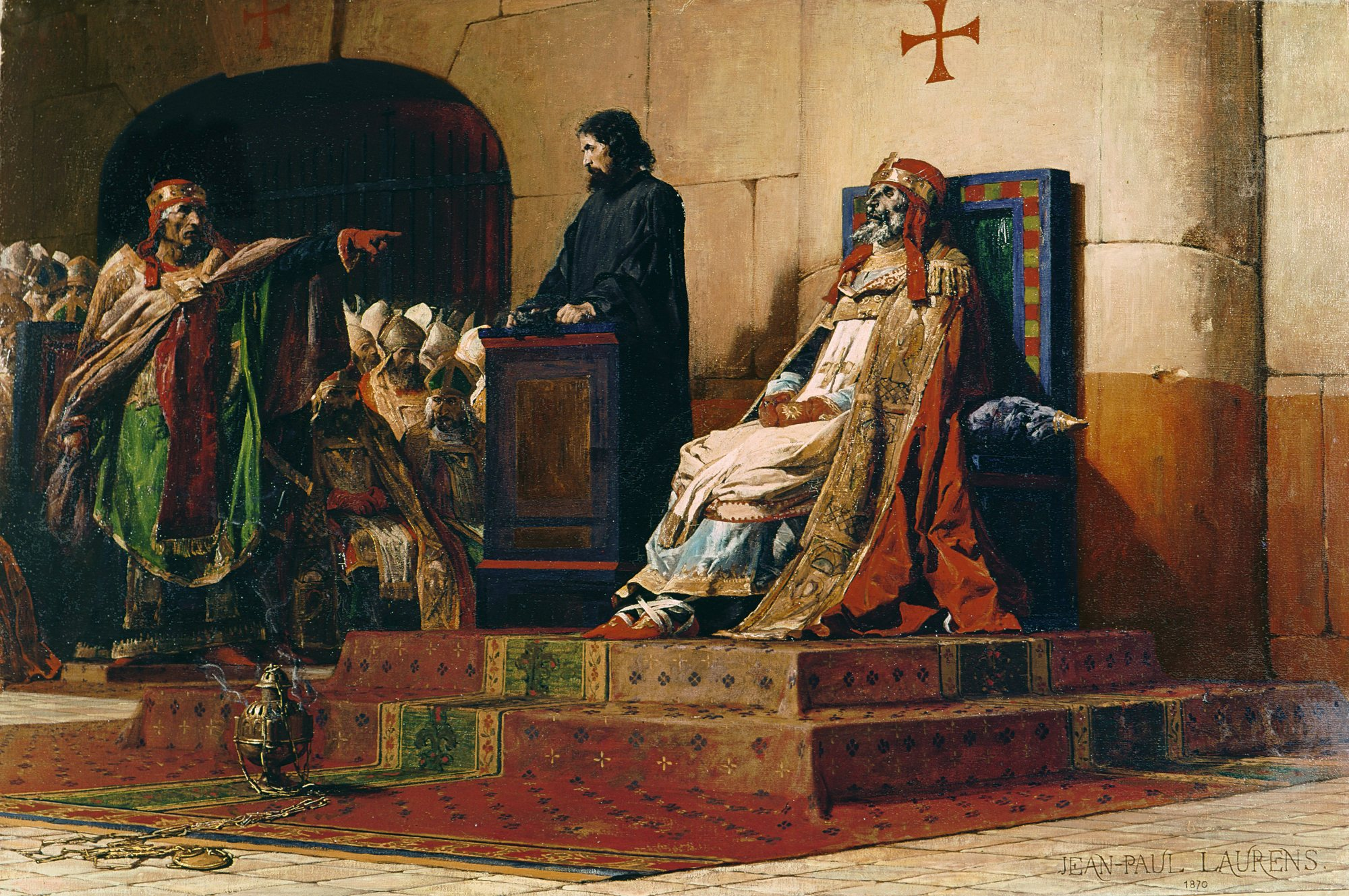
Pope Formosus and Stephen VI—The Cadaver Synod, 1870

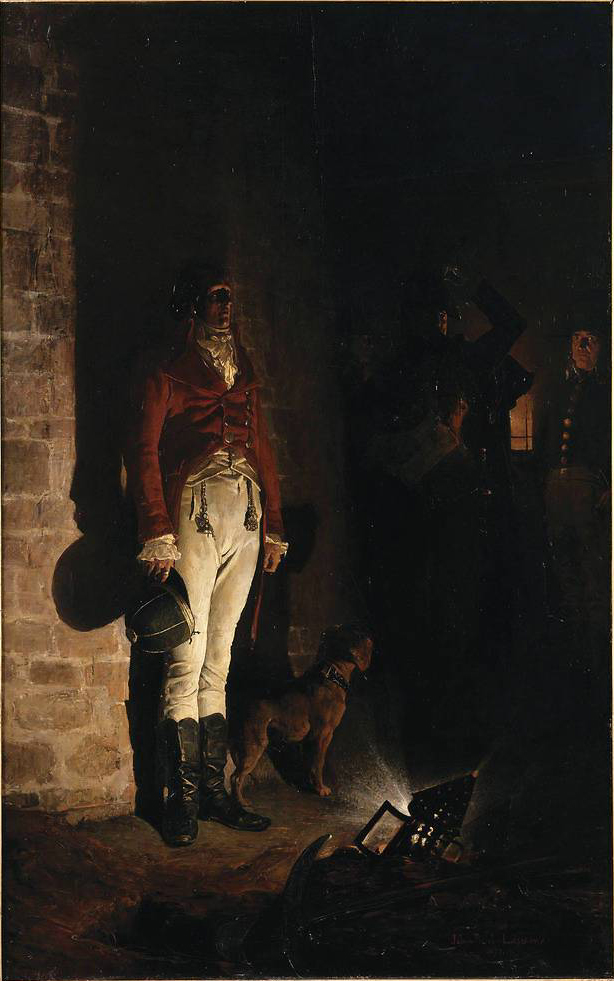
The Execution of the Duke of Enghien, 1873

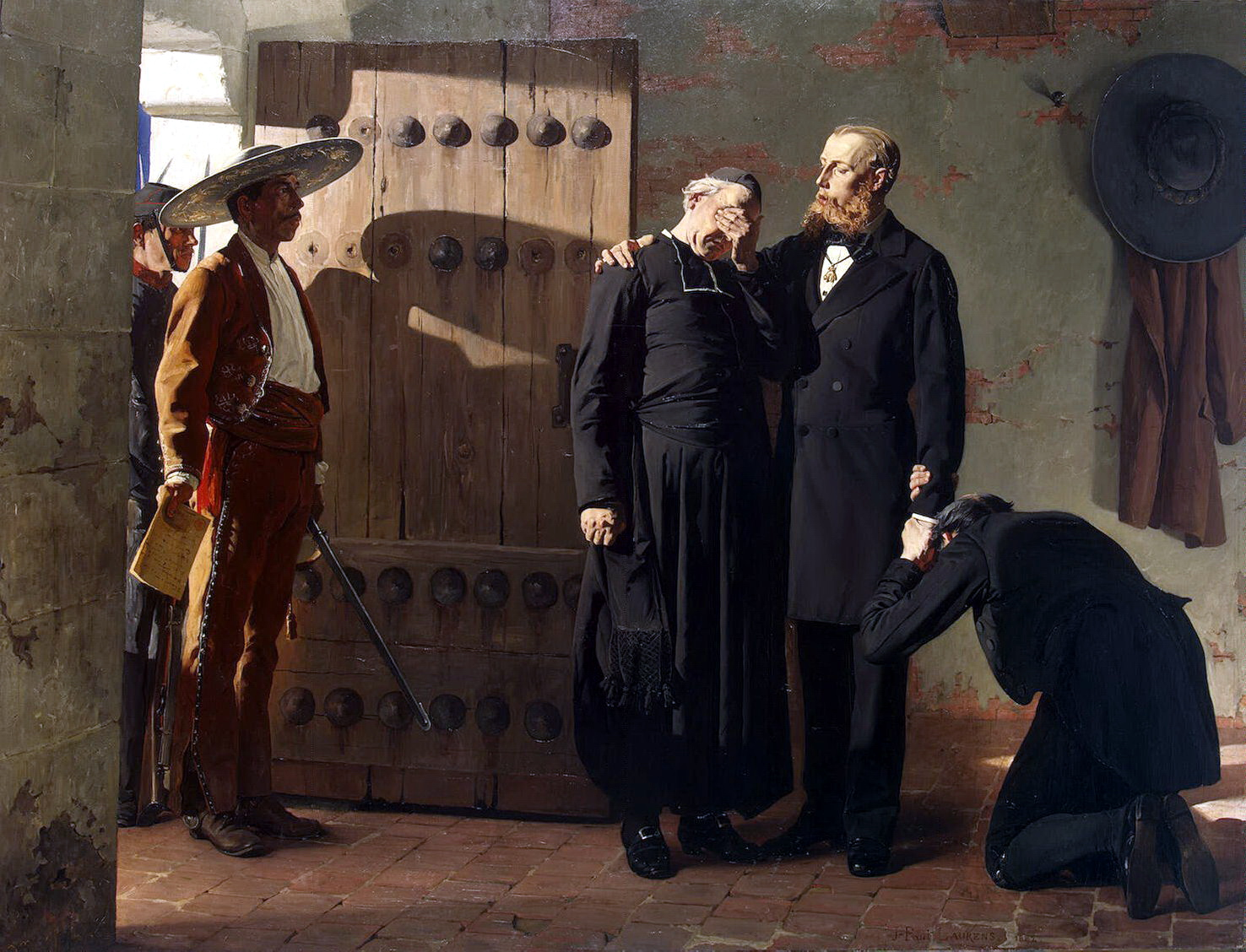
The Last moments of Maximilian, Emperor of Mexico, 1882

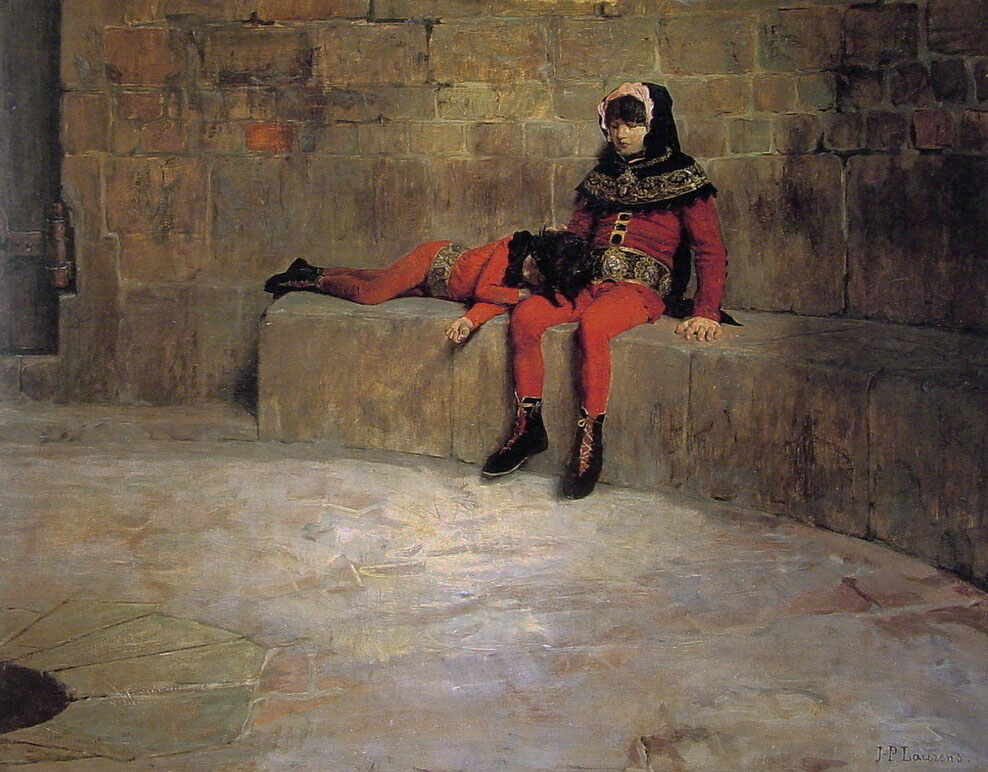
Hostages, 1896
