= Angèle Delasalle =

French painter and engraver (1867–c.1941)

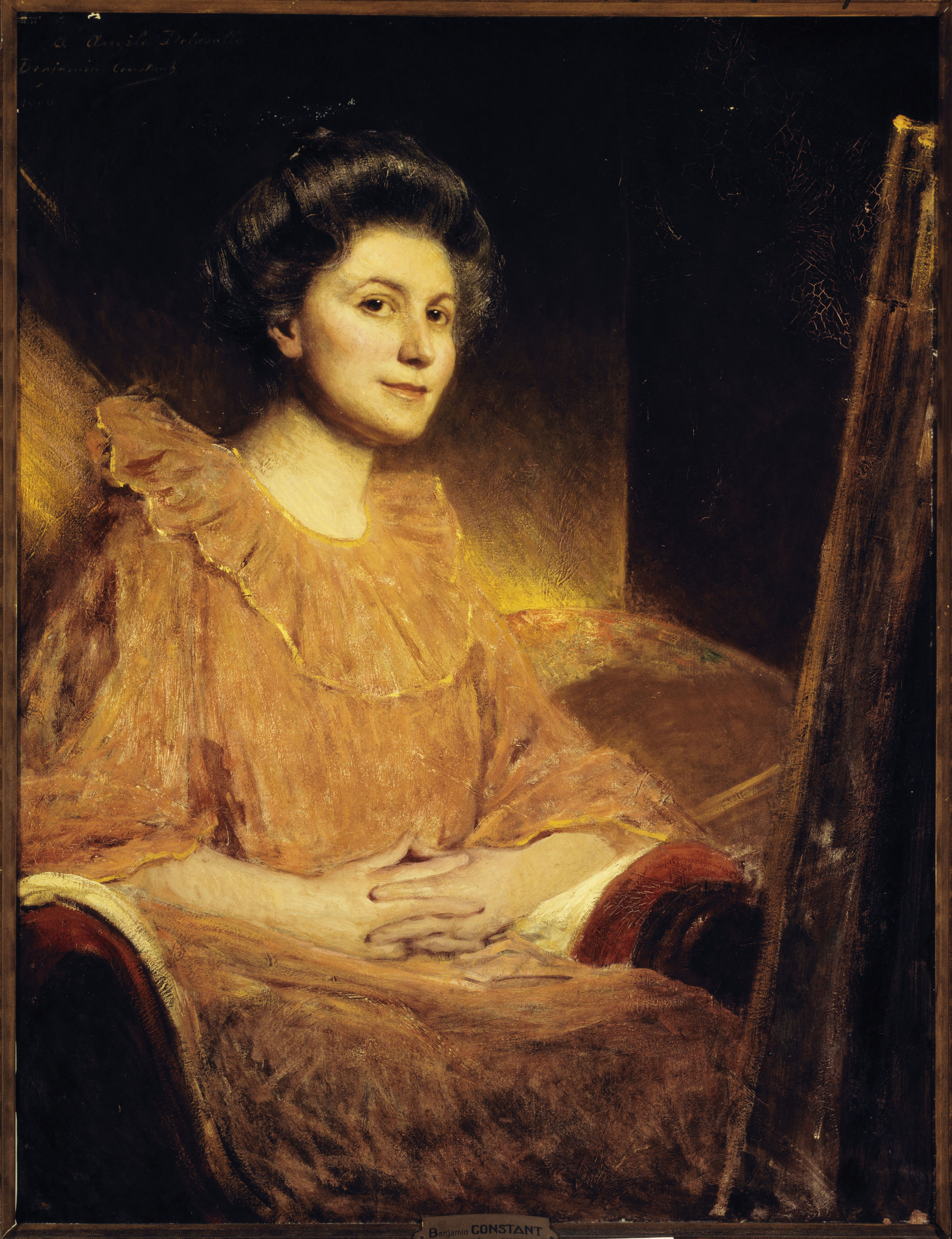
- Portrait of Angèle Delasalle by Jean-Joseph Benjamin-Constant
- Born: Mathilde Angèle Delasalle; 25 February 1867; Paris, France
- Died: c. 1939–1941; Saint-Martin-de-Ré, France
- Education: Académie Julian
- Occupations: Painter, etcher

Mathilde Angèle Delasalle (25 February 1867 – c. 1941) was a French artist known for her painting and etching. Her works are held in the collections of many museums.

== Biography ==
Delasalle first attended a convent school in Paris, the "Institution des Dames Augustines anglaises de Neuilly." From 1880 to 1890 she studied at the private art school Académie Julian and studied with Jean-Joseph Benjamin-Constant, Jean-Paul Laurens and Jules Joseph Lefebvre.

=== Exhibits ===
Delasalle's first exhibition took place in 1888 with a portrait of a lady at the Société des Artistes Français.

According to Women in the Fine Arts, B. Dufemex wrote about Delasalle in the Magazine of Arts, June 1902.

This artist came into notice in 1895 by means of her picture of Cain and Enoch's Daughters. Since then her annual contributions have demonstrated her gradual acquirement of unquestionable mastery of her art. Her characteristic energy is such that her sex cannot be detected in her work; in fact, she was made the first and only woman member of the International Association of Painters under the impression that her pictures — signed simply A. Delasalle — were the work of a man.

In 1899 a state travel scholarship allowed her to paint in Italy, the Netherlands and England, where "she absorbed the influences of Rembrandt and Turner." In the 1890s Delasalle expanded her subject matter from portraits to female nudes and she started showing her etchings in about 1904. She also became known for her rendering of landscapes such as Views from Greenwich Park and images of animals, in addition to scenes from the work world and portraits of other artists of her time such as Pierre Prins (1907). Her works were exhibited in Paris, Liège and Munich. Her studio was located at 3 rue Jean Baptiste Dumas in the 17th arrondisment of Paris.

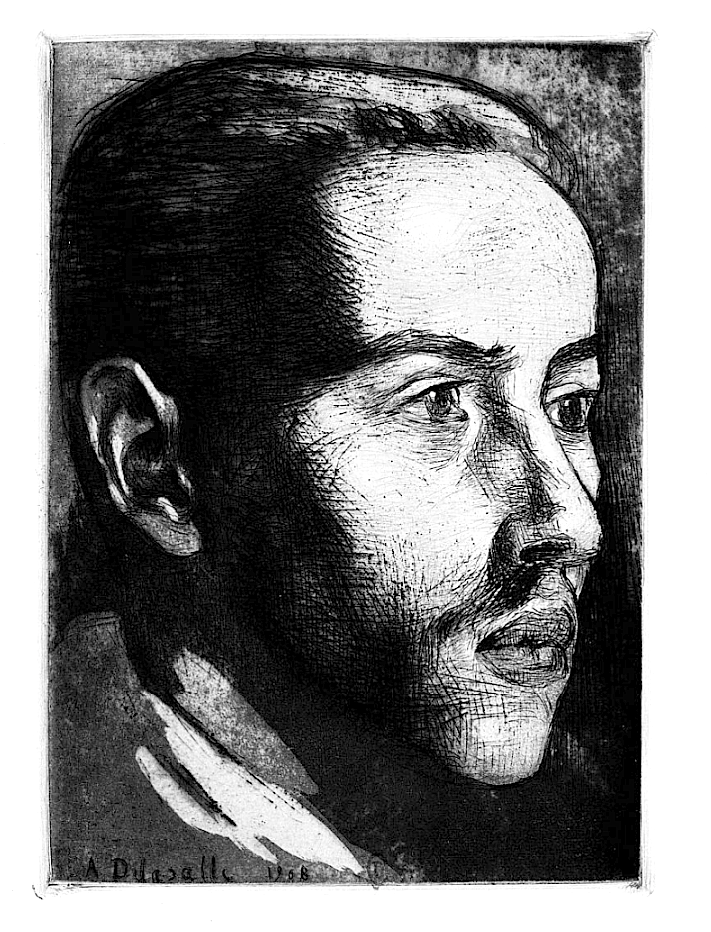
Portrait of a young man, etching by Delasalle in 1908. Published in La Gazette des beaux-arts, 1912, vol. 2.

Delasalle was a member of the “Societé Internationale de Peinture et Sculpture” and a founding member of the Société du Salon d'Automne. She received several exhibition medals, including one in 1897 for Return from the Hunt (Salon des Artistes Français) and a silver medal at the 1900 worlds fair, better known as the Paris Exposition. The travel grant was awarded to her by the “Conseil Supérieur des Beaux-Arts."

In 1926 Delasalle was made a Chevalier of the Légion d'Honneur.

Her work was also featured in a 2003 exhibition in Bordeaux that traced the "emergence of prehistory as a scientific discipline and source of artistic inspiration," Musée d'Aquitaine.

=== Death ===
The date of Delasalle's death is in dispute with sources saying, "after 1938," 26 August 1939 or 1941. According to Graves,

Benezit simply says it was post-1938; a number of other sources give 1939; the Departement des Arts Graphiques of the Louvre gives it as around 1941; Joconde, the catalogue of the collections of French museums prepared by the French ministry of culture, gives the date firmly as 1941.

== Gallery ==
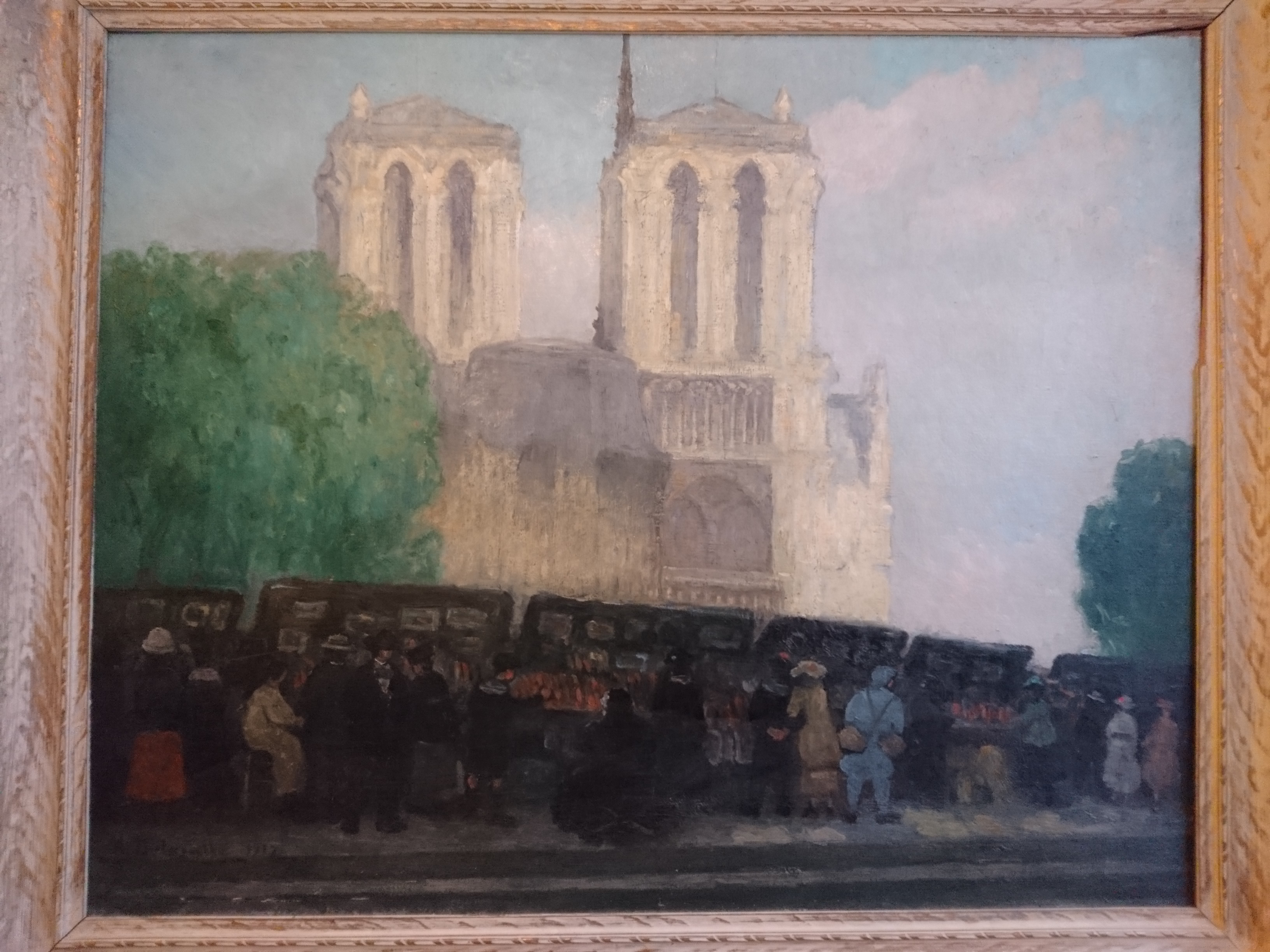
Quai des Grands Augustins

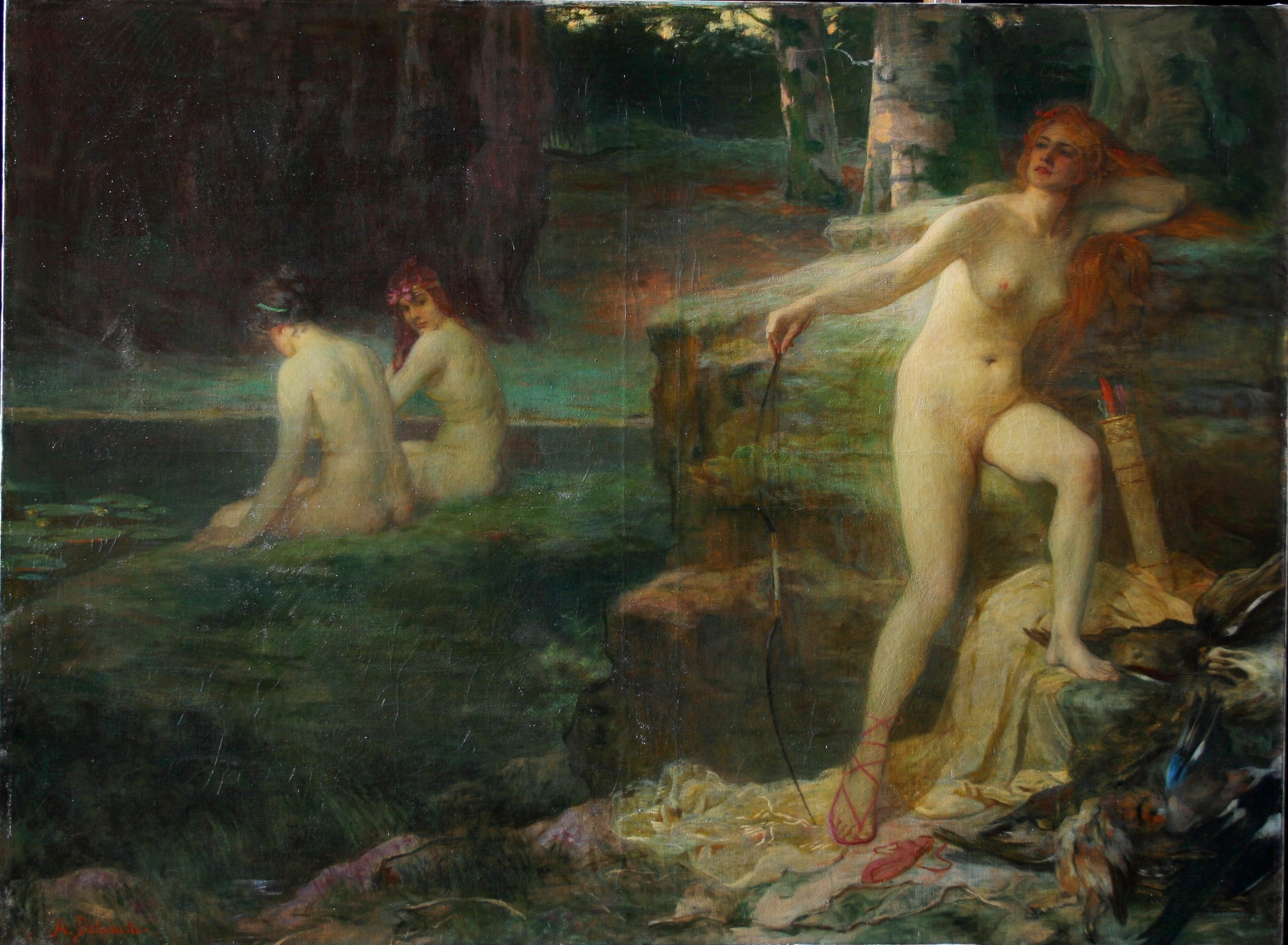
Diane au repos

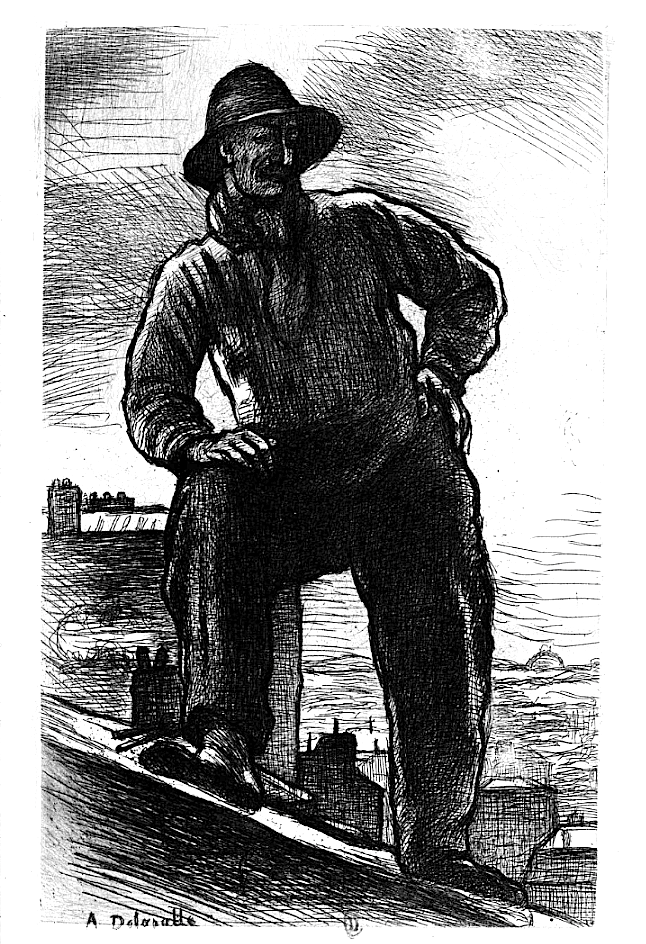
Le Couvreur

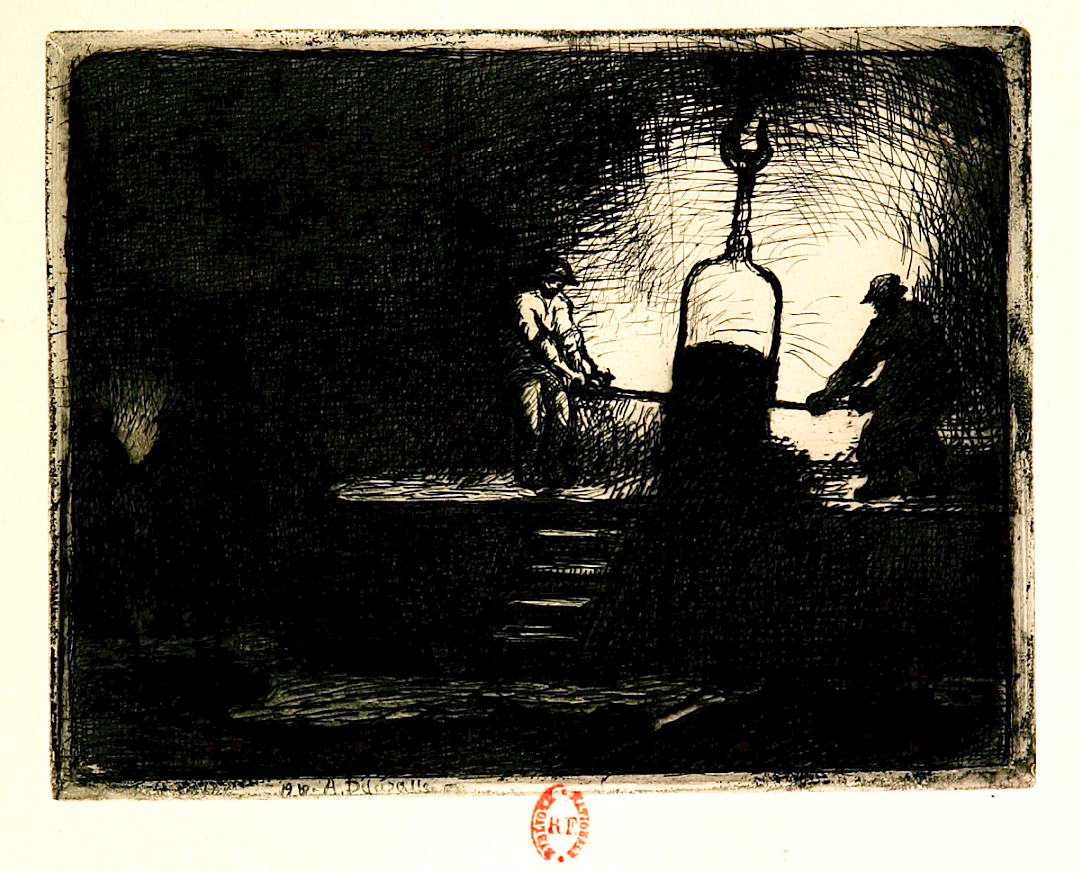
Coin de fonderie

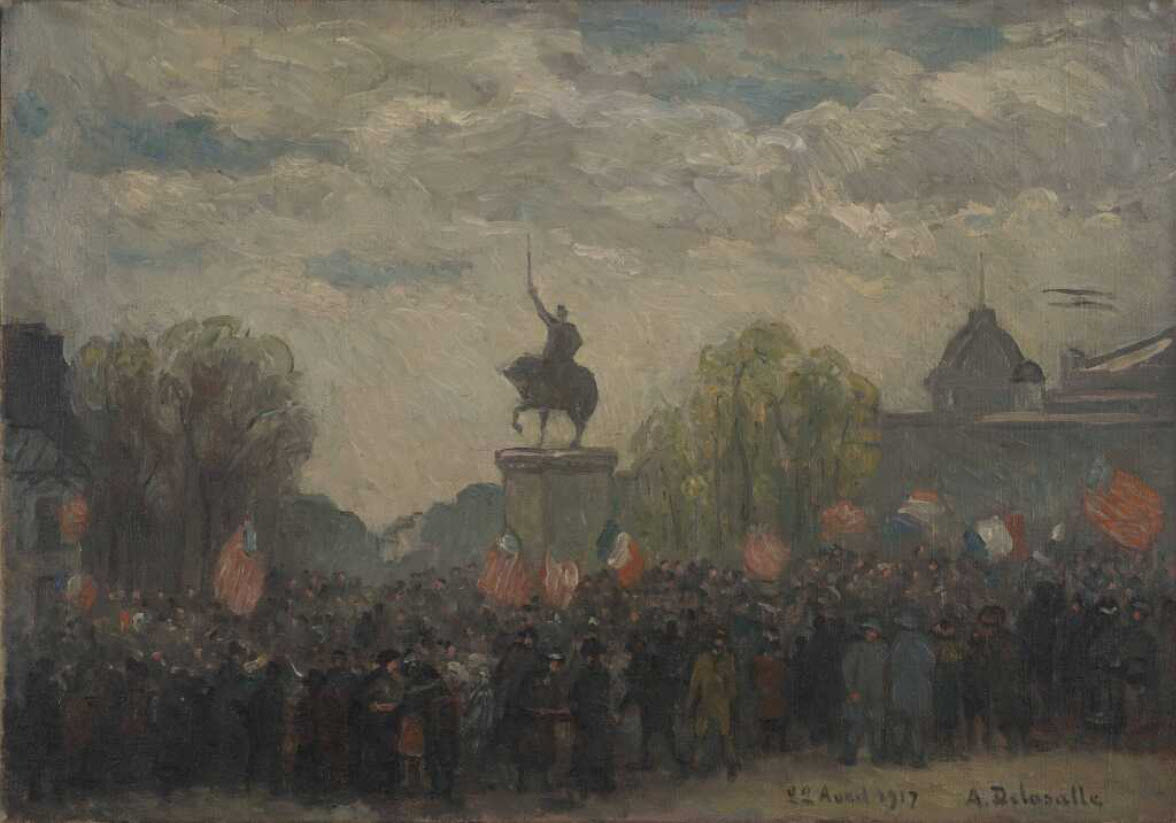
La Place d'Iéna le 22 avril 1917

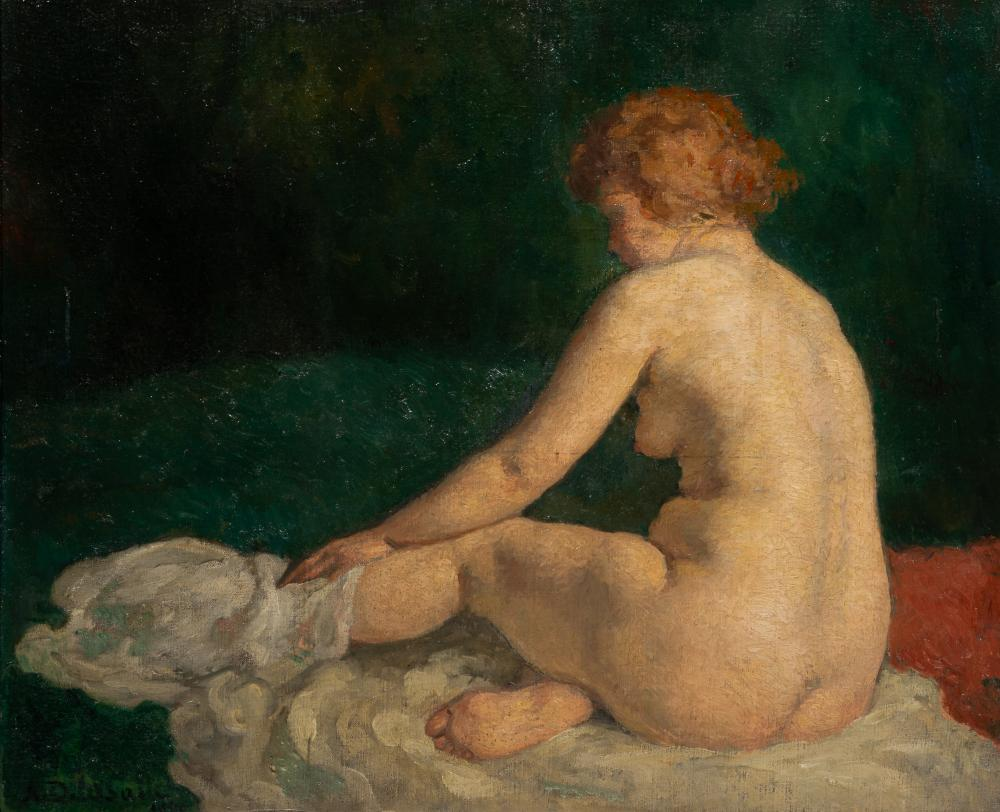
La Baignade

== Selected works ==
Delasalle's work was widely exhibited and awarded during her lifetime.

Paintings

- 1895: Cain and the daughters of Enoch
- 1897: Diana in repose
- 1898: Coming home from the hunt (Poitiers Town Hall, awarded a medal) (Exhibited in the Paris Salon in 1898)
- 1899: The Earthworker (Petit Palais)
- 1899: An Evening in Saint-Cloud (G. Petit Gallery in Paris)
- 1900: The forge (Museum in Rouen)
- 1901: The horse pond at Pont Saint-Cloud (Museum in Nantes)
- 1901 and 1902: Portraits of Benjamin Constant (Musée du Luxembourg and Kunsthalle Bremen)
- 1902: The roofer
- 1905: Portrait of the painter Jules Adler
- 1910: Woman at the toilet
- 1911: Girls bathing
- 1912: The Duke of Montpensier on the tiger hunt
- 1917: Left Bank Book Stalls (Paris) Notre Dame in background
- 1920: Women in the park
- 1927: View of the Arc de Triomphe

Etchings

- 1904: The forge
- 1908: Portrait of a young man
- 1909: Apse of Saint-Germain-L'Auxerrois
- 1909: Reclining female nude
- 1910: Allée de Meudon
