= Wood Gaylor =

American artist

- Wood Gaylor in 1937 taken by Emil Ganso
- Born: Samuel Wood Gaylor, Jr. October 7, 1883; Stamford, Connecticut, US
- Died: August 13, 1957 (aged 73); Glenwood Landing, New York, US
- Resting place: Brookville Cemetery, Upper Brookville, New York
- Known for: Artist

Wood Gaylor (1884–1957) was an American artist known for his colorful canvases of festive events painted in a flat, unmodeled style that struck critics as "witty" and "wisely naïve". He also made colored wood carvings in relief as well as colored etchings, aquatints, drypoints, watercolors, and drawings. His work appeared in the 1913 Armory Show and many other exhibitions during the first half of the twentieth century. During most of his long career, he participated in New York arts organizations as founder, officer, or active member. Known as a "fun-loving iconoclast" of the art world, he was also a businessman, who, in a long and successful career, worked his way up from office boy to head of a firm that manufactured sewing patterns. Gaylor married twice, both times to artists. With his second wife, Adelaide Lawson, he raised a family in a quiet hamlet on the North Shore of Long Island.

Critics praised his work throughout his career and after his death. In 1930, for example, a critic for the New York Times wrote that some in the art world had begun to see Gaylor as "an American Bruegel". However, the critic said the comparison did not do justice to Gaylor since he was not an imitator but had his own individuality. In 1979, another Times critic discussed the features that distinguished his work, writing, "Although Mr. Gaylor's paintings appear to be primitive, they are only superficially so. Their simple, charming figures and clean, unshaded colors are organized in meticulously orchestrated compositions that are clearly the work of a sophisticated hand." She added that his style was "an alternative to both academic and abstract art".

== Early life and education ==
Wood Gaylor was born in Stamford, Connecticut, on October 7, 1883. During his childhood, the family frequently moved from one place to another. When he was 16, during a time when his family was located in Manhattan, Gaylor left school and took work as an office boy for a company that made sewing patterns. Thereafter, continuing to work in the sewing pattern industry, he advanced in position from designer, to assistant manager, to head of Manhattan-based companies in that business until he retired not long before his death. He began his art training in 1909 with classes at the National Academy of Design and continued through 1912 by taking individual instruction from Walt Kuhn at the New York School of Art in Fort Lee, New Jersey. During that time he and Kuhn formed a long-lasting friendship.

== Career in art ==
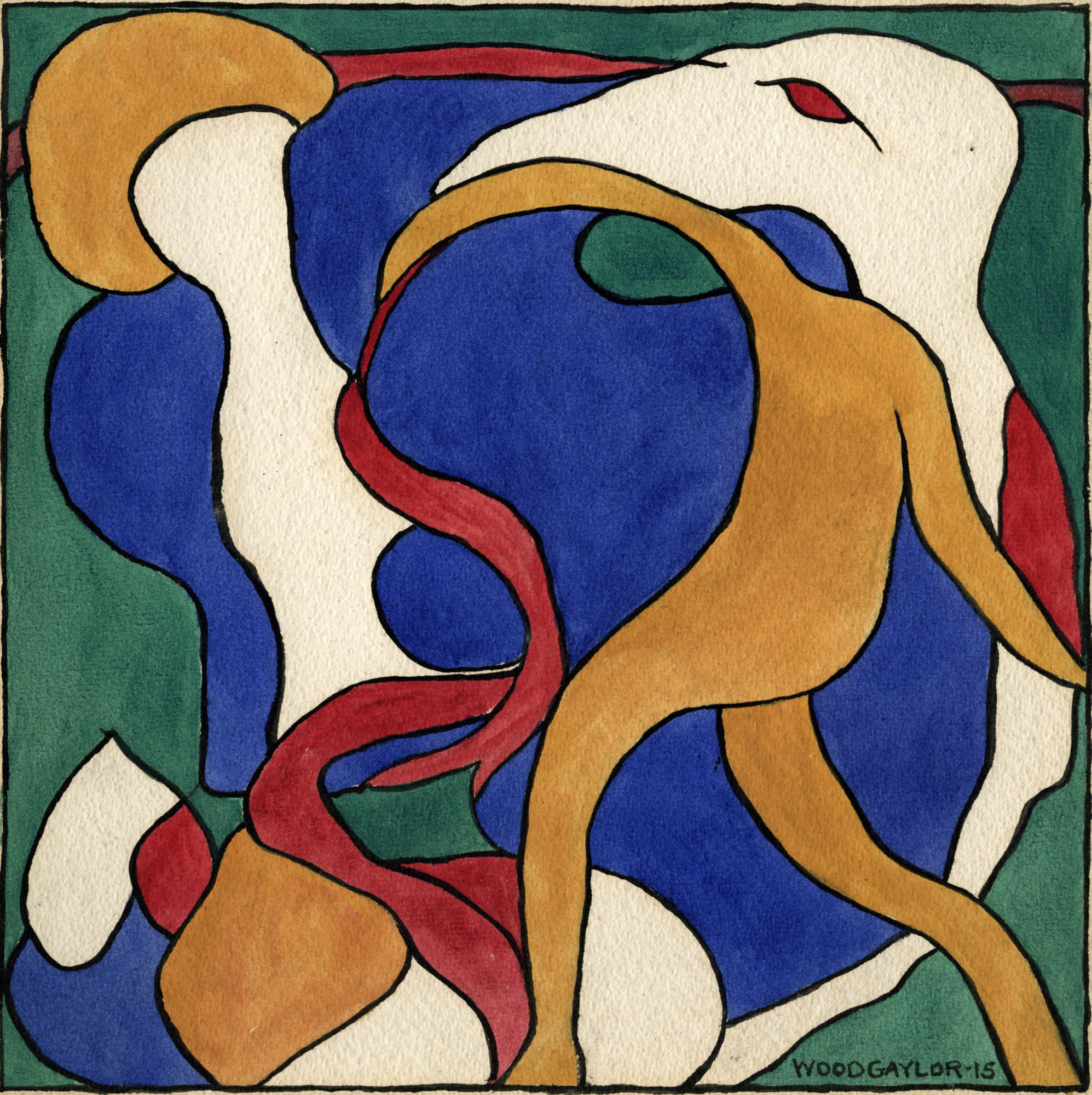
Wood Gaylor, Abstract Figure Study, 1915, watercolor, 10 x 10 inches

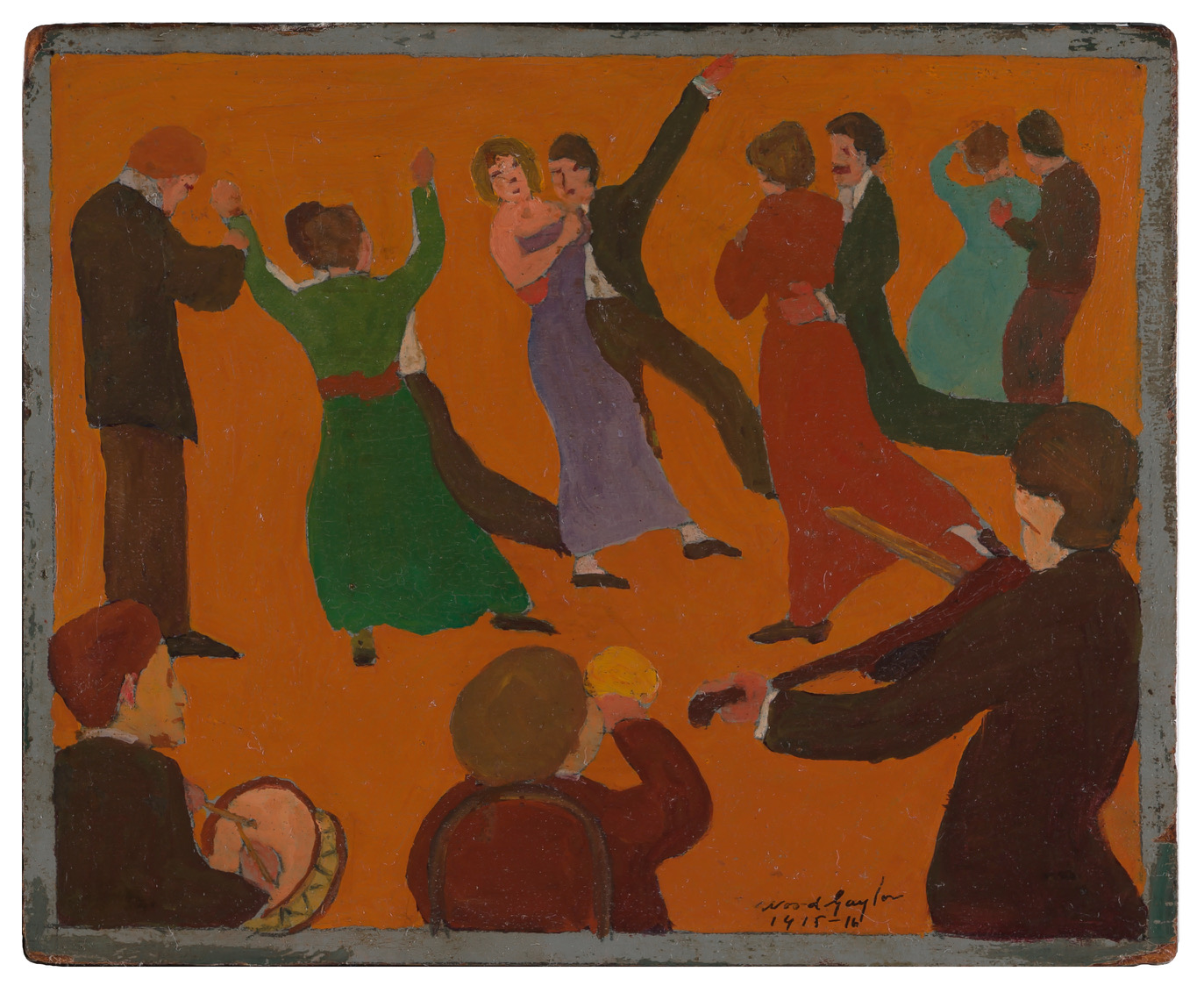
Wood Gaylor, Social Dance, 1915-16, oil on canvas, 7 x 8 1/2 inches

Gaylor had two paintings accepted for exhibition at the 1913 Armory Show which Kuhn had helped to organize. Both were said to be impressionist in style. In 1915, he painted an abstract work (shown at right) and became a member of the short-lived Cooperative Mural Workshop run by Katherine Dreier and her sister Dorothea. When he participated in a group exhibition held by the group that year (and possibly showed that painting), a critic described the works on view as "brilliant and vivid" in color and "simple and direct" in design. The next year, in February, the Thumb Box Gallery gave him a solo exhibition and he participated in a group exhibition at the Montross Galleries. Calling the solo exhibition "exceedingly interesting", a critic for American Art News said the carved and painted wood panels he showed were "exceptionally good in color and design" and noted that Gaylor "utilizes humans for designs in an amazing way". In reviewing the group show, a critic described the painting called "Dawn" that Gaylor contributed as "well designed, but with terra cotta colored and non-modeled figures of a father and mother whose child is darker than they are." The painting, "Social Dance" of 1915-16 (shown at right) may have been included in this exhibit. In October 1916, he showed works in a group exhibition at Montross Galleries organized by the New York Society of Etchers. In 1917, Gaylor joined Kuhn and others in a short-lived group called the Penguin Club which, like the Armory Show, aimed to provide support for artists who rejected the conservative aesthetics of the National Academy. In March of that year, he participated in one of the first exhibitions held by the club. A critic described the drypoints, aquatints, and etchings that he showed as "interesting" with disconcerting color effects. The critic also said Gaylor's carved wood panels showed good drawing and striking coloring.

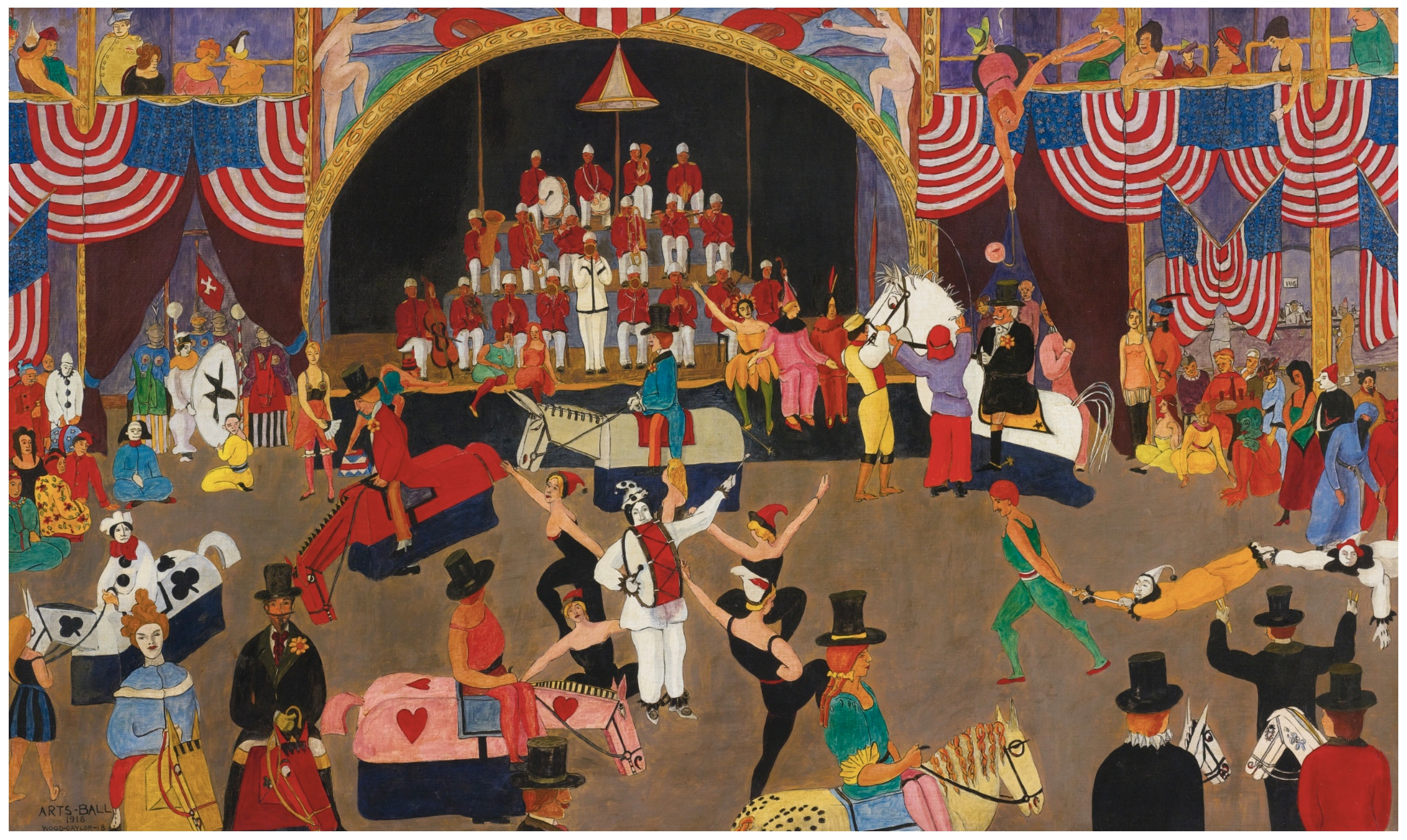
Wood Gaylor, Arts Ball, 1918, oil on canvas, 27 x 45 inches

In addition to exhibitions, the Penguin Club staged costume balls featuring skits and choreographed productions. Gaylor's painting, "Arts Ball, 1918" (shown at left), conveys the off-beat gaiety of this annual event. Gaylor completed the work later in the year and showed it in a Penguin Club exhibition in October. In February 1917, the New York Herald described the Arts Ball held that year. The organizers had sent invitations to artists, illustrators, and writers. They and their guests were required to wear costumes in a Latin-American theme. Dancing commenced at 9:00 pm. An hour later, the dancing was interrupted for what the reporter called a "spectacle which even the most ardent member declared could grace a Spanish-American village only upon the most abnormal and arduous day". Judging by Gaylor's painting, Arts Ball of 1918 was neither less spectacular nor more conventional. Some months later, Gaylor participated in a group exhibition sponsored by the Penguin Club. Reviewing the show, a critic singled out Gaylor's carved and painted wood panels as deserving special mention. The critic praised both their good drawing and their "striking coloring". Still later that year, he contributed works on paper at a group exhibition sponsored by the People's Art Guild. A critic noted that the drypoints he showed fell "short of ideality".

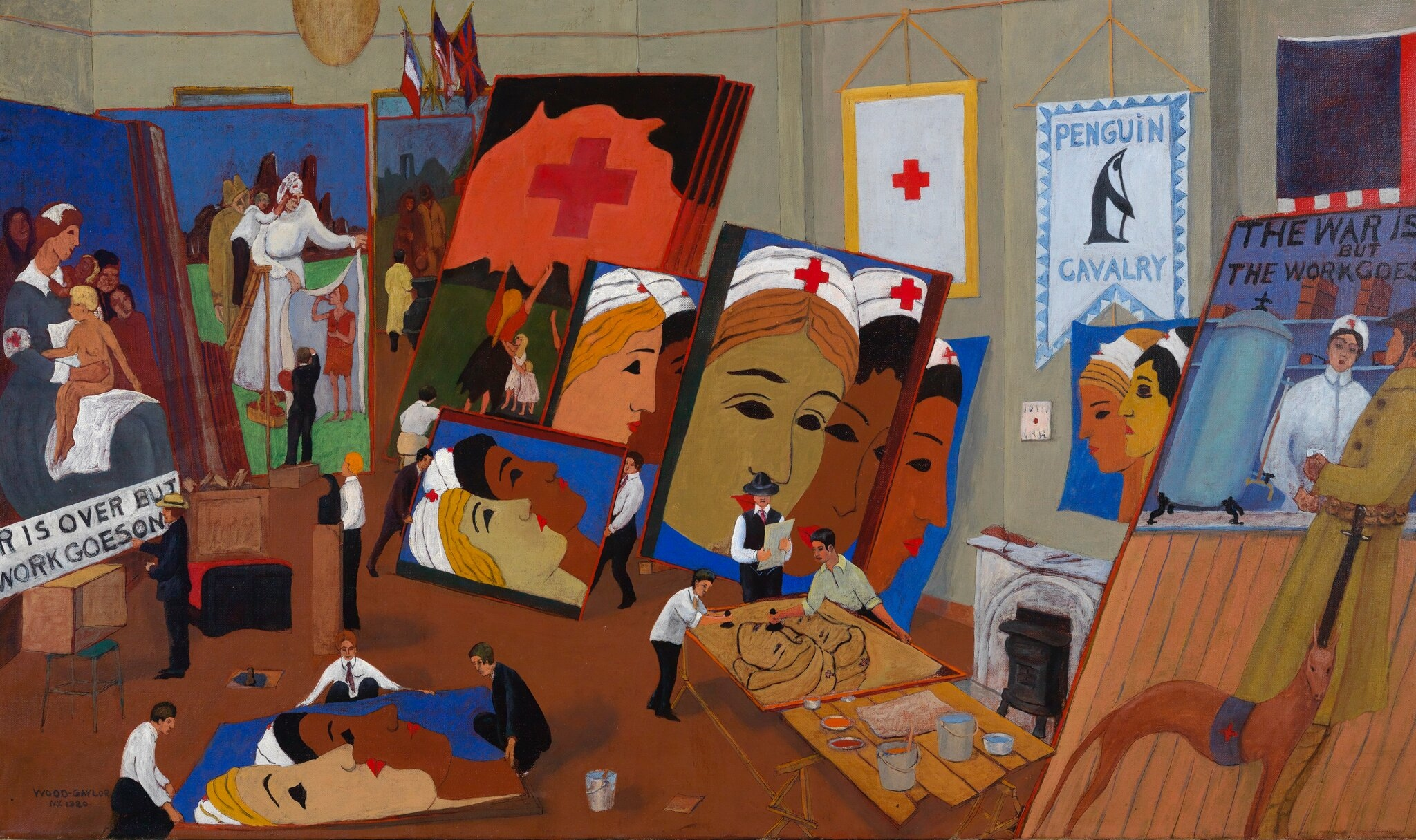
Wood Gaylor, Posters, 1920, Heckscher Museum

In 1920, Gaylor made a dramatic painting showing members of the Penguin Club preparing posters in aid of a Red Cross bond drive (shown at right). That year, he also had two small etchings in a group exhibition at the Montross Galleries one of which drew forth from a New York Times critic a comparison Dante Gabriel Rossetti's "Genevieve" "in the purity of its medieval spirit". The following year, a critic described a low-relief wood carving by Gaylor as "a gay little childish free gesture", saying, "It will be seen, and rightly, as an artist's idea triumphantly carried out".

During the 1920s and 1930s, Gaylor continued participating in the semi-annual exhibitions of Salons of America and many other group shows (including Anderson Galleries: 1921, Wanamaker Gallery: 1922, Modern Artists of America at Brummer Galleries: 1922, People's Art Assembly: 1922, Brooklyn Society of American Artists: 1923, New Playwrights Theatre: 1927, Valentine Dudensing Gallery: 1927, Downtown Gallery: 1930 to 1934 inclusive, Brooklyn Museum: 1930, Pynson Printers gallery: 1931, Reinhardt Galleries: 1933, Public Works of Art Project: 1934, and the Municipal Committee: 1938).

The Spring Salons of America exhibition of 1923 included loans from local museums and collectors. It showed Chinese, ancient Greek, and modern French masters, such as Cézanne, Picasso, and Gauguin, along with works made by its own members. Noting the show's wide disparity of artistic styles, a Times critic said Jules Pascin and Gaylor did not try to out-do the imported works but showed what it was they could do. Using a gastronomic figure of speech, the critic said, "Pascin is the more economical, although he uses more lines because he obtains a more than proportionate increase of flavor, but Mr. Gaylor gets a flavor that is more to American taste, one that is less suggestive of something put up in tin to disguise the toughness of the fowl or its cold-storage associations". In 1932 Gaylor showed portrait studies in watercolor and pencil along with his more familiar oil paintings of festive Greenwich Village scenes in a solo exhibition at the Downtown Galleries.

Gaylor did not exhibit in the late 1930s or throughout the 1940s. He held one show in 1950. No other exhibitions were reported until three years following his death in 1957. As noted below, he had moved out of the city at the beginning of that period and had become the head of a company that made sewing patterns. During the period, he and his wife were occupied with raising their three children and he had become involved in local politics in the suburban community where he lived. The weak market for art sales in many of those years may also have been a factor in his decision to stop offering works for sale.

Wood Gaylor, "Fourteenth Street", 1956, oil on canvas, 14 3/4 x 24 1/2 inches

Gaylor's late painting "Fourteenth Street" (shown at right) revisits a scene from 1917 in Manhattan and shows a social-conscience side of his approach to art. A curator noted: "The image resounds strongly as a slice of life from a busy New York thoroughfare from the 1910s. Clearly, Gaylor is equating the sordid message in the movie "Traffic in Souls" with the oppressive workload of the seamstresses, whose sweatshop labors provide the attire of the well-dressed group in the lower half of the picture. At times a sharp social commentator, Gaylor is keenly aware not only of the pleasurable pastime of movie going, but also the toil of the less fortunate." In 1962 Gaylor's widow showed works of his in a barn adjacent to the house they had shared and where she still lived. The following year, the Zabriskie Gallery mounted a retrospective exhibition of paintings and works on paper. A critic for the New York Times said the works shown were "full of clever anecdotes and witticisms smuggled in under a naïve deadpan" and added that the Greenwich Village Bohemianism which was their subject would be difficult to depict in any other manner. Works by Gaylor appeared in group shows in 1964 and 1978 and then in another retrospective in 1979. The 1979 show, at Gallery Odin, in Port Washington, New York, mixed Gaylor's paintings with paintings by his wife, the artist, Adelaide Lawson, and works the two of them had purchased or been given by artist friends. Two other retrospectives appeared in 2021, one, a traveling exhibition that began at the Heckscher Museum of Art in Huntington, New York, and the other at Bernard Goldberg Fine Arts in Manhattan.

=== Artistic style ===
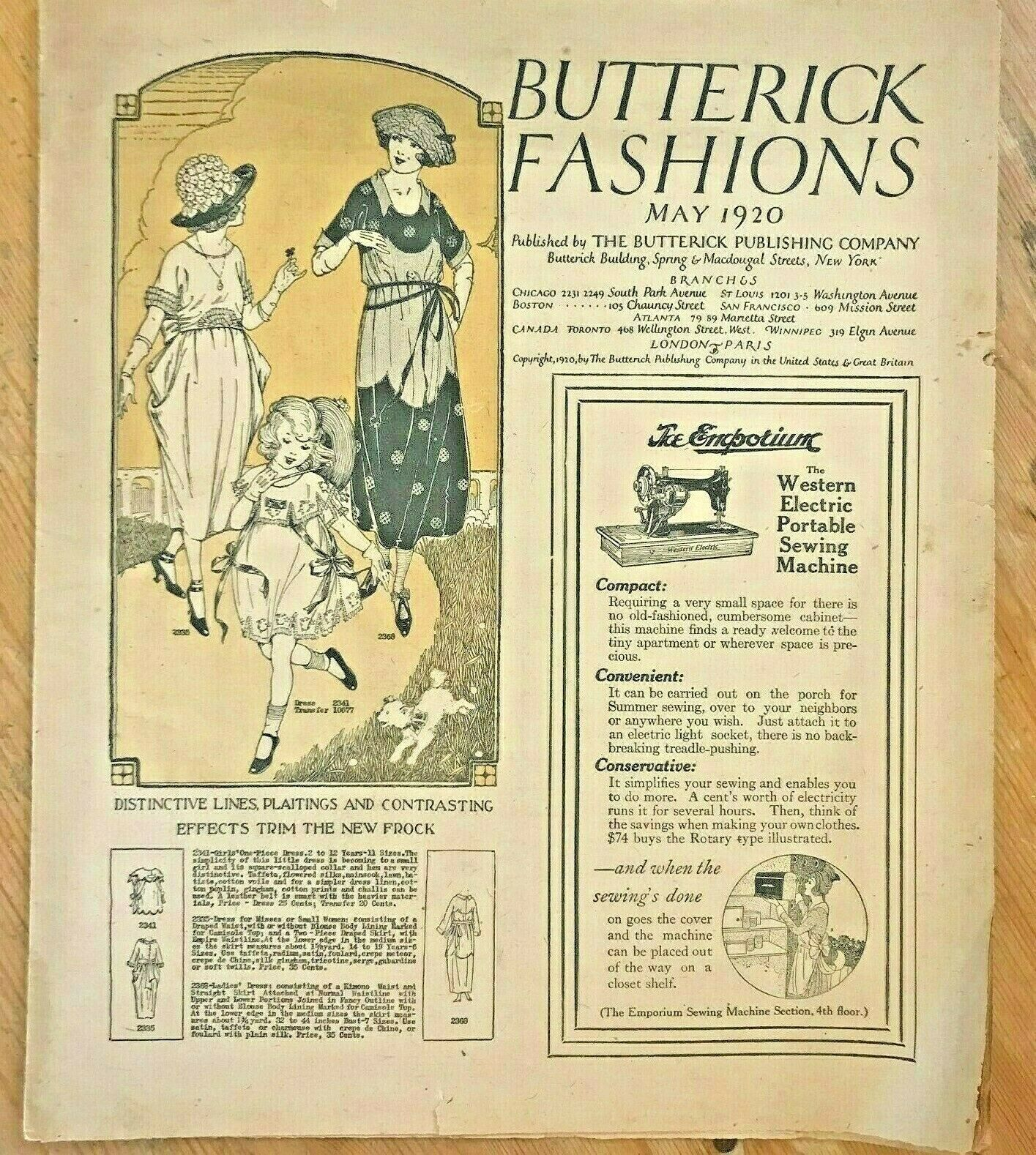
Reproduction of a page from "Butterick Fashions, May 1920, 14 x 10 1/2 inches

New York Pattern Company, Reproduction of a pattern for a misses day dress from the 1940s

Throughout his career as an artist, Gaylor earned his living in New York's sewing pattern industry. He began in that business making line drawings like the one at left published in 1920 by Butterick's, the company where he first worked. By the 1940s, having become head of another firm, the New York Pattern Company, he oversaw the preparation of drawings such as the one shown at right. The figures in these pictures lack modeling. There is no shading and there are no shadows. They are flat, like paper dolls. These descriptors are the same as those used by critics to describe many of Gaylor's paintings. In 1930, a New York Times critic described the figures in his paintings as "flat like paper dolls, similar to pattern illustrations" and said they had the appearance of figures that had "been cut out of paper and pasted upon a flat ground". In 1979, a Times critic described his paintings as "simple, charming figures and clean, unshaded colors". The critic added that the figures "are organized in meticulously orchestrated compositions that are clearly the work of a sophisticated hand" and described his style as "an alternative to both academic and abstract art".

Critics noted a theatrical approach and stage-like settings of his compositions. They described them as thronged with figures in a lighthearted and entertaining manner. One said he showed "la vie Bohème in the Greenwich Village... done in a primitivist style that sends simplified little people running like clockwork toys all over the place in flat, knowingly spaced compositions. They called his work clever and amusing, as one said, "full of vivacity and bright color, and with the careful arrangement inevitable where spontaneous appearance is successfully maintained. They said his work was witty and, as one said, "wisely naïve".

These critical appraisals all concern the oil paintings for which he has become best known. However, as noted above, he also made carved and painted wood reliefs and many works on paper: etchings, drypoints, aquatints, and watercolors and these, in their time, also received critical praise.

=== Arts organizations ===
Gaylor had an outgoing personality. He liked social events and had managing skills that enabled him to help run nonprofit organizations as well as business concerns. Throughout much of his art career, he served in New York arts groups in roles such as president, secretary, publicist, or simply active member. He was a founding member of the Penguin and Kit Kat Clubs. He was also a founder and long-time president of Salons of America and founder and secretary of Modern Artists of America. He belonged to the Brooklyn Society of Modern Artists. He was a founder and vice president of the Hamilton Easter Field Foundation. He served on the boards of the New York City Municipal Art Committee and the Museum of Art, Ogunquit, Maine.

== Personal life and family ==
Wood Gaylor, "Steven's Point", 1929, oil on canvas, 19 1/2 x 27 1/2 inches

Gaylor was born in Stamford, Connecticut, on October 7, 1883. His birth name was Samuel Wood Gaylor, Jr. His parents were Samuel Wood Gaylor, Sr. (born 1853), and Margaret Cecilia (McLean) Gaylor (born 1858). Gaylor's father ran a sequence of saloons, inns, and rooming houses along the Connecticut shore and in Manhattan. Gaylor had a sister, Mabel (born about 1886). "Steven's Point" (shown at left) depicts himself with his father, mother, and sister in a shoreline barroom of a hotel that his father managed in 1888. Painted in 1929, it shows Gaylor holding a duck by its feet. He stands to the left of his mother. Mabel is standing on her right. His father stands behind the bar at far left. The viewer seems to be placed in an open doorway with a floor mat at his or her feet and there is water on the floor that, together with the hot stove in the center of the room, suggests cold and wet weather. At that time, Steven’s Point was a lonely maritime outpost on the Connecticut panhandle near Darien. By the time he was 16, Gaylor's family had moved to Manhattan. He had left school and was working as an office boy while living at home.

In 1909 Gaylor married Ruth E.M. Lorick. The couple lived in Bergen, New Jersey She took art classes at the New York School of Applied Design for Women and he worked as a draftsman. She had been born in Stockholm in 1890. They had a daughter, Ruth Wood Gaylor, born in 1912. In the early 1910s, Gaylor found work in New York at Butterick's, a company that made garment patterns for home sewers. By 1917, Gaylor had moved to a competitor, the Home Pattern Company, as its assistant manager. In 1920, Gaylor, his wife Ruth, and their daughter lived in a rooming house run by his parents. Gaylor and Lorick divorced sometime between 1920 and 1926. After the divorce, Ruth lived with her mother. Lorick earned her living as an artist and took in a boarder to help pay the rent.

In 1926, Gaylor married fellow artist Adelaide Lawson. They had known each other for some years as students and participants in New York arts organizations. (Note: During the early 1920s, Gaylor and Lawson came to know one another while taking classes at the Art Students League and while they were directors of Salons of America. Lawson associated with the artists of the Penguin Club, but, while welcome to help with annual fund-raising events, could not participate in their meetings or exhibitions. "Of course I could not go," she told a reporter in 1982. "They wouldn't have any females.") They remained married until Gaylor died in 1957.

During the early years of their marriage, they lived in Greenwich Village. Gaylor and Lawson had two sons, Wynn Lawson Gaylor, born about 1927, and Randall, born about 1930, and a daughter, Isabel Dale. In 1934, after spending summer vacations in Glenwood Landing for two years, they moved permanently to that Long Island hamlet and Lawson remained there following Gaylor's death in 1957. In the early 1940s, Gaylor took over as head of another pattern making business, the New York Pattern Company, Inc. He retired from New York Pattern about 1955.

Gaylor died on August 12, 1957, in Glenwood Landing.
