= Doris Patty Rosenthal =

American painter

Doris Patty Rosenthal (July 10, 1889 – November 26, 1971) was an American painter, printmaker, designer, and educator, who made solitary explorations into remote areas of Mexico in search of indigenous peoples. Over several decades beginning in the 1930s, Rosenthal made hundreds of sketches in charcoal and pastel depicting the everyday life and domestic activities of Indian and mestizo peasant culture, which she later used to create large-scale studio paintings. Life magazine featured Rosenthal's art and travels in Mexico in a five-page spread in 1943.

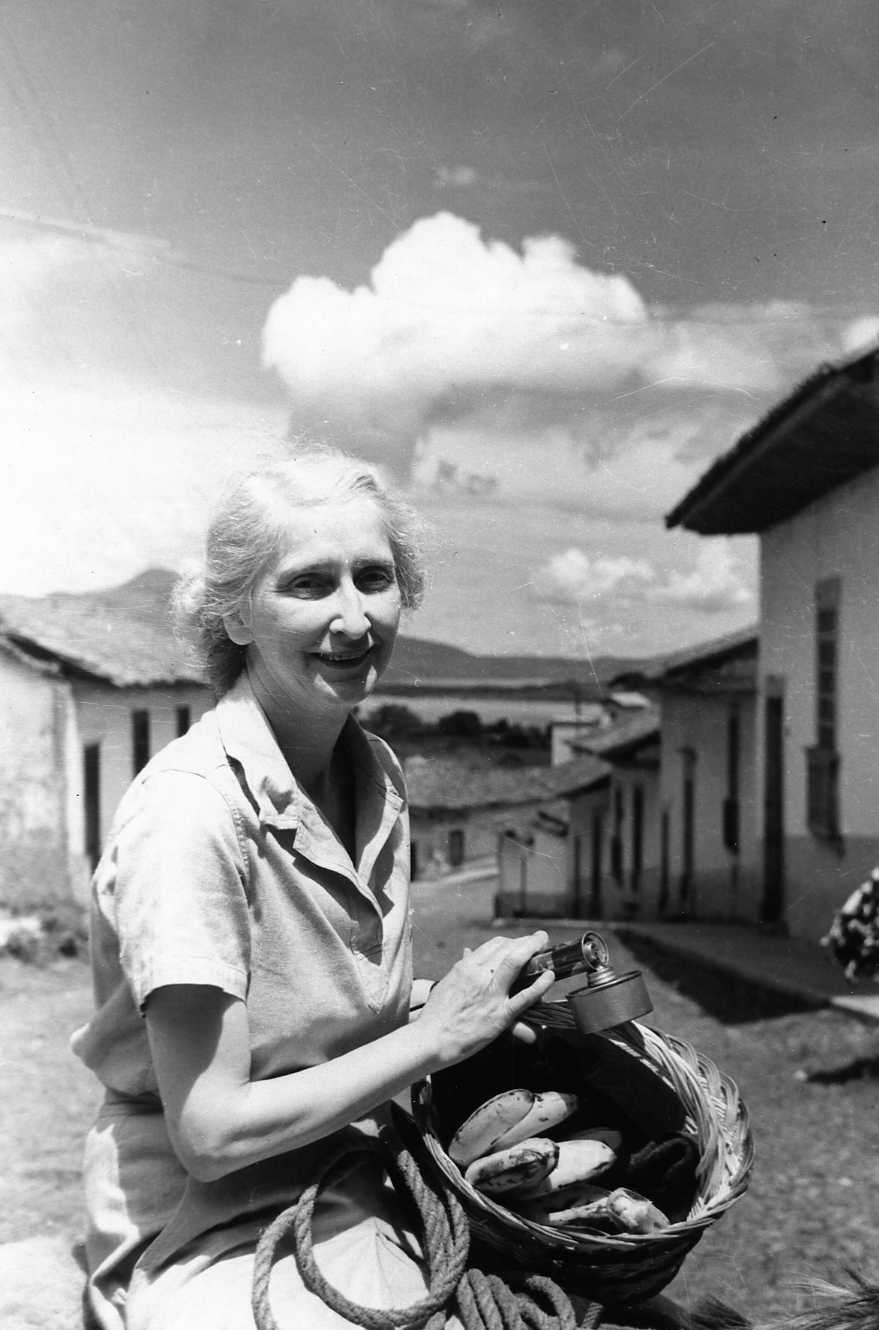
Doris Rosenthal setting out on a sketching trip, Pátzcuaro, Mexico, 1943

The John Simon Guggenheim Memorial Foundation awarded Rosenthal a fellowship in 1931 to do creative work in painting in Mexico, where she was to live for two years beginning in August that year. Thereafter she made yearly trips to the country, residing in small villages during the summer months. The Guggenheim Foundation awarded her a second fellowship for further work in Mexico in 1936. Rosenthal moved permanently to Mexico in 1957, and died in the city of Oaxaca in 1971.

== Early life and career ==
Rosenthal was born in Riverside, California, in 1889 into a prosperous Jewish family and raised on a ranch. Her father, Emil Julius Rosenthal, had settled in Riverside in 1872 from Müelhasen, Thüringen, Prussian (Germany), and married Anna Jane Unruh. Rosenthal launched her career as an artist in Los Angeles in the 1910s, when progressive trends were emerging in southern California art. Rosenthal was close to Helena Dunlap, the pioneer Los Angeles modernist and founder in 1916 of the Los Angeles Modern Art Society, one of the first modernist groups to form in the region.

Rosenthal and Dunlap traveled to Taos, New Mexico, in 1917. There, they briefly resided and exhibited alongside the leading American painters George Bellows, Robert Henri and others in the inaugural exhibition in Santa Fe's new Fine Arts Museum. Rosenthal exhibited in the California Art Club spring exhibitions at the Los Angeles Museum in 1917 and 1919, showing Indian Women of Taos in 1917.

Rosenthal went to New York to study at the Art Students League with Bellows and John Sloan in 1917–1918, and attended classes in the studio of the broad-minded bohemian George Luks. In 1920, she worked as a commercial designer of silks to fund a trip to Europe.

== Later career ==
Rosenthal studied first at the Académie de la Grande Chaumière in Paris, and then went on a sketching trip to Berlin, Rome, and Munich, staying throughout 1921 and 1922. Following her European tour, she married Charles “Jack” Charash, a press agent, theatrical manager, dramatist, and co-founder of the Anglo-Jewish Theatre, a unit of the WPA Federal Theatre Project.

In the late 1920s, Rosenthal published a series of portfolios featuring design motifs drawn from the art and artifacts of an international array of museum collections. The Prim-Art Series portfolios are arranged around themes such as transportation, costumes, and animal motifs. The series signaled her study of ethnographic or 'primitive' art and culture and were instrumental in winning her two Guggenheim awards to work in Mexico. The portfolios helped introduce new aesthetics to design, and were acclaimed as useful resources for professional designers and as teaching tools for art instructors.

Rosenthal was a lifelong art instructor and educator, having earned a degree in teaching from Los Angeles State Teachers College in 1910, and Teachers College of Columbia University in 1913. She taught painting and drawing in Columbia University's Teachers College from 1924 to 1931, and at James Monroe High School in the Bronx thereafter.

Doris Rosenthal produced a large body of work over a six-decade career. Her Depression-era American Scene paintings focusing on Mexican life and culture were nationally respected and covered by major art publications and popular magazines such as Life, Newsweek, Harper’s Bazaar, and the New Yorker. She had the support of the eminent critics and historians Edward Alden Jewel, Lewis Mumford, and Carleton Beals; and the Midtown Galleries in New York handled her paintings and works on paper. Her work was included in important exhibitions such as American Painting Today at the Metropolitan Museum of Art.

According to Mexican art critic Gulliermo Rivas: "Doris Rosenthal is not striving to escape her work, but rather to go out and meet it."
