= Karl Yens =

American painter

Karl Yens (January 11, 1868 – 1945), also Karl Jens was a German-American who was noted for both plein-air paintings of the California impressionist movement as well as Modernism.

Yens was born Karl Julius Heinrich Jens was born in Altona, Hamburg, Germany and trained in art with Max Koch in Berlin and Jean-Joseph Benjamin-Constant and Jean-Paul Laurens in Paris. He emigrated to the U.S. and settled in Laguna Beach, California in 1910. He was a founding member of the California Water Color Society and a member of the Modern Art Society.

== List of paintings ==
- America The Beautiful (1918)
- Arch Beach Tavern
- Dawn, Laguna Beach (1931)
- First Art Gallery, Laguna (1920)
- Fun With Breakers
- In The Garden
- In Yosemite (1919)
- Diogenes, A.K.A. Mr. Mann - The Useful Citizen (1920)
- Nature's Charm
- Study in White (1924)
- Weaver's Camp, Yosemite (1919)
- Woman on Horseback in Yosemite (1919)
- Yosemite Scene (1919)
- Their Castle (1921)
