= George Hayter =

English painter (1792–1871)

Sir George Hayter
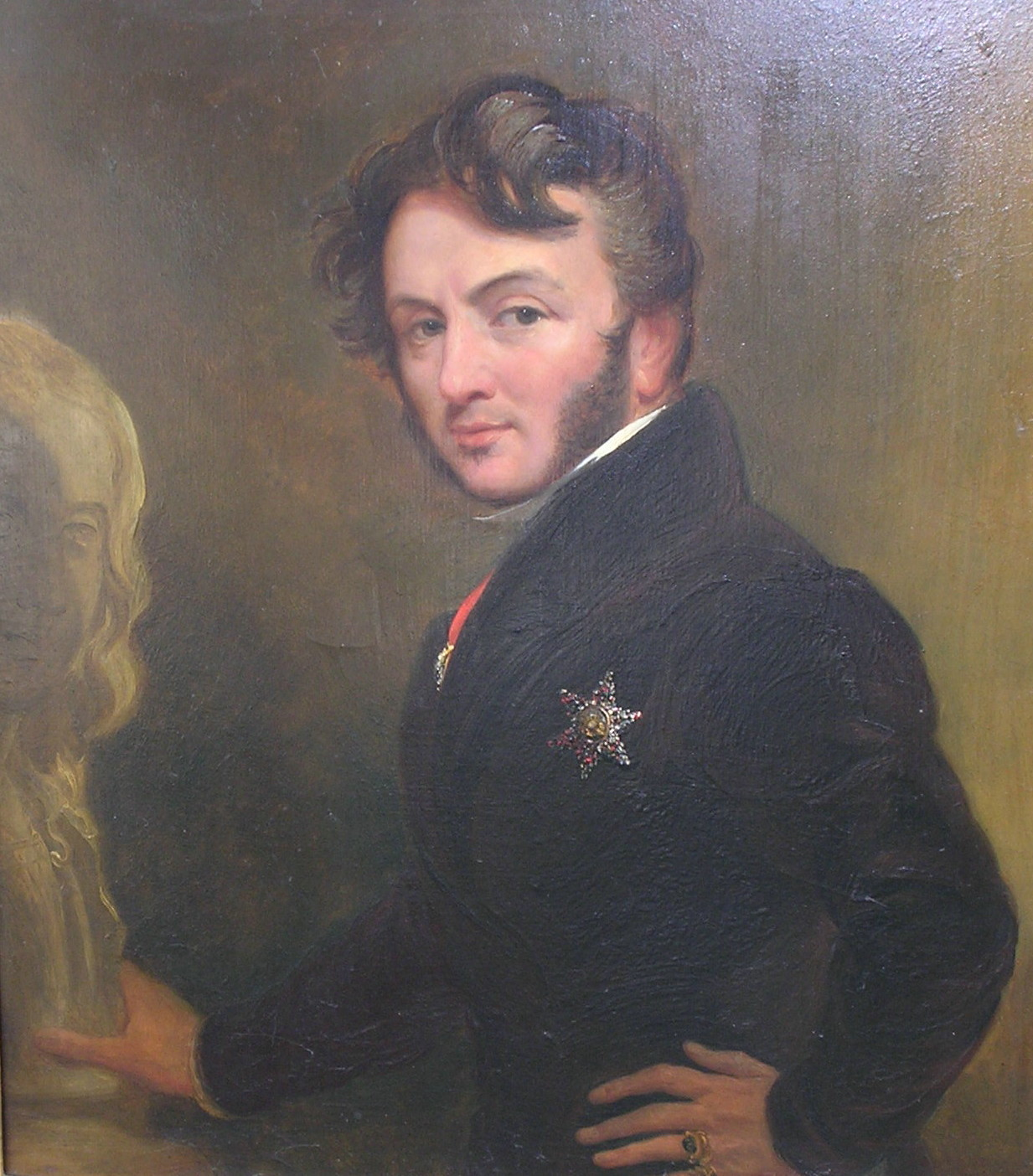
- Self-portrait, 1843
- Born: George Hayter; 17 December 1792; St. James's, London, England
- Died: 18 January 1871 (aged 78); Marylebone, London, England
- Education: Royal Academy Schools
- Occupation: Painter
- Notable work: The Trial of Queen Caroline in the House of Lords 1820; The First Meeting of the Reformed House of Parliament 1833; State Portrait of HM Queen Victoria 1838; The Coronation of HM Queen Victoria 1838; The Marriage of Queen Victoria 1840; The Christening of the Prince of Wales 1842
- Movement: Romanticism
- Children: 5
- Parent(s): Charles Hayter; Martha Stevenson
- Relatives: John Hayter (brother)
- Awards: Knight Bachelor, Knight of the Lion and the Sun of Persia, Member of the Academies of St. Luke (Rome), Bologna, Parma, Florence and Venice
- Patrons: Queen Victoria, King Leopold I of the Belgians, 6th Duke of Bedford, 6th Duke of Devonshire

Sir George Hayter (17 December 1792 – 18 January 1871) was an English painter, specialising in portraits and large works involving sometimes several hundred individual portraits. Queen Victoria appreciated his merits and appointed Hayter her Principal Painter in Ordinary and also awarded him a Knighthood in 1841.

== Early life ==
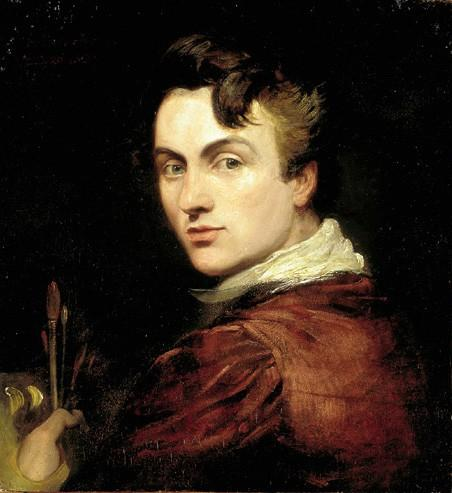
Self-portrait of George Hayter aged 28, painted in 1820 (National Portrait Gallery)

Hayter was the son of Charles Hayter (1761–1835), a miniature painter and popular drawing-master and teacher of perspective who was appointed Professor of Perspective and Drawing to Princess Charlotte and published a well-known introduction to perspective and other works.

Initially tutored by his father, he went to the Royal Academy Schools early in 1808, but in the same year, after a disagreement about his art studies, ran away to sea as a Midshipman in the Royal Navy. His father secured his release, and they came to an agreement that Hayter should assist him while pursuing his own studies.

In 1809 he secretly married Sarah Milton, a lodger at his father's house (he was 15 or 16, she 28), the arrangement remaining secret until around 1811. Together they had three children Sophia (born and died 1811), Georgiana (born 1813) and William Henry (born 1814).

At the Royal Academy Schools he studied under Henry Fuseli, and in 1815 was appointed Painter of Miniatures and Portraits by Princess Charlotte. Hayter was awarded the British Institution’s premium for history painting for the Prophet Ezra (1815; Downton Castle), purchased by Richard Payne Knight.

Around 1816 his wife left him, for reasons which are not apparent. He subsequently began a relationship with Louisa Cauty, daughter of Sir William Cauty, with whom he lived openly for the next decade and who bore him two children, Angelo and Louisa.

== Travel to Italy ==
Encouraged by his patron, John Russell, 6th Duke of Bedford, he travelled to Italy to study in 1816. There he met Antonio Canova, whose studio he attended while painting his portrait, where he absorbed Canova's classical style. He is also believed to have learned sculpture from Canova at this time. Canova was Perpetual Principal of the Accademia di San Luca (Rome's premier artistic institution) and doubtless put Hayter forward for honorary membership on the strength of his painting The Tribute Money which was very favourably received in Rome. Hayter thereby became the Academy's youngest ever member.

== Historical portraiture ==
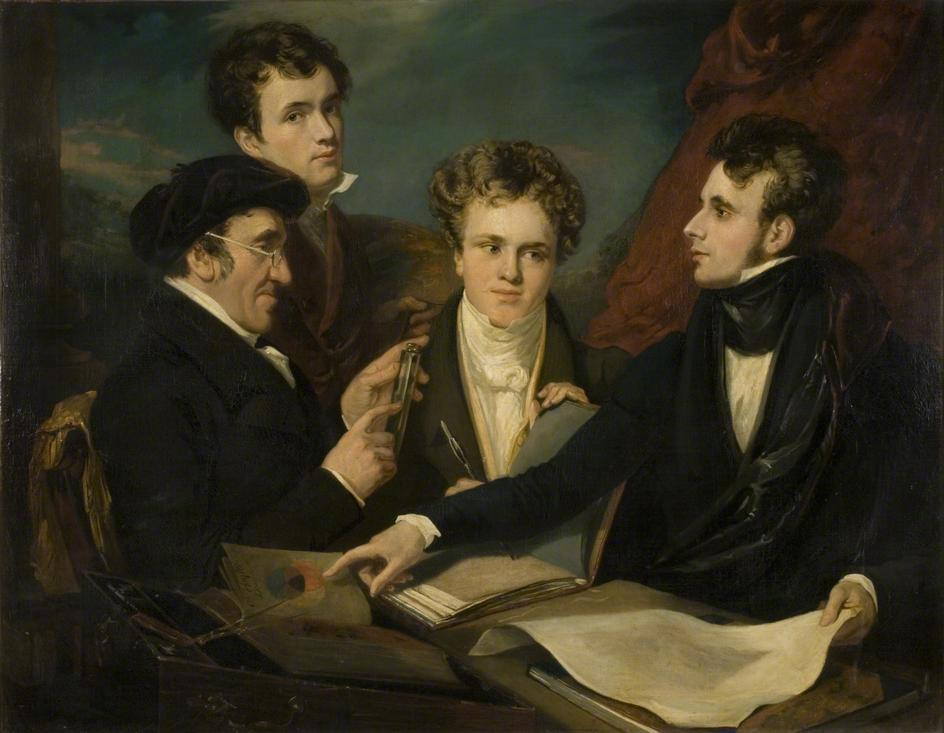
A Controversy on Colour, by John Hayter (1800–1891) showing from left to right Charles Hayter (father of John and George), John Hayter, Edwin Landseer and George Hayter (Shipley Art Gallery

Returning to London in 1818, Hayter practised as a portrait painter in oils and history painter. Dubbed ‘The Phoenix’ by William Beckford, Hayter showed a pomposity that irritated his fellow artists, but he mixed freely with many aristocratic families. His unconventional domestic life (separated from his wife, yet living with his mistress) set him apart from official Academy circles: he was never elected to the Royal Academy.

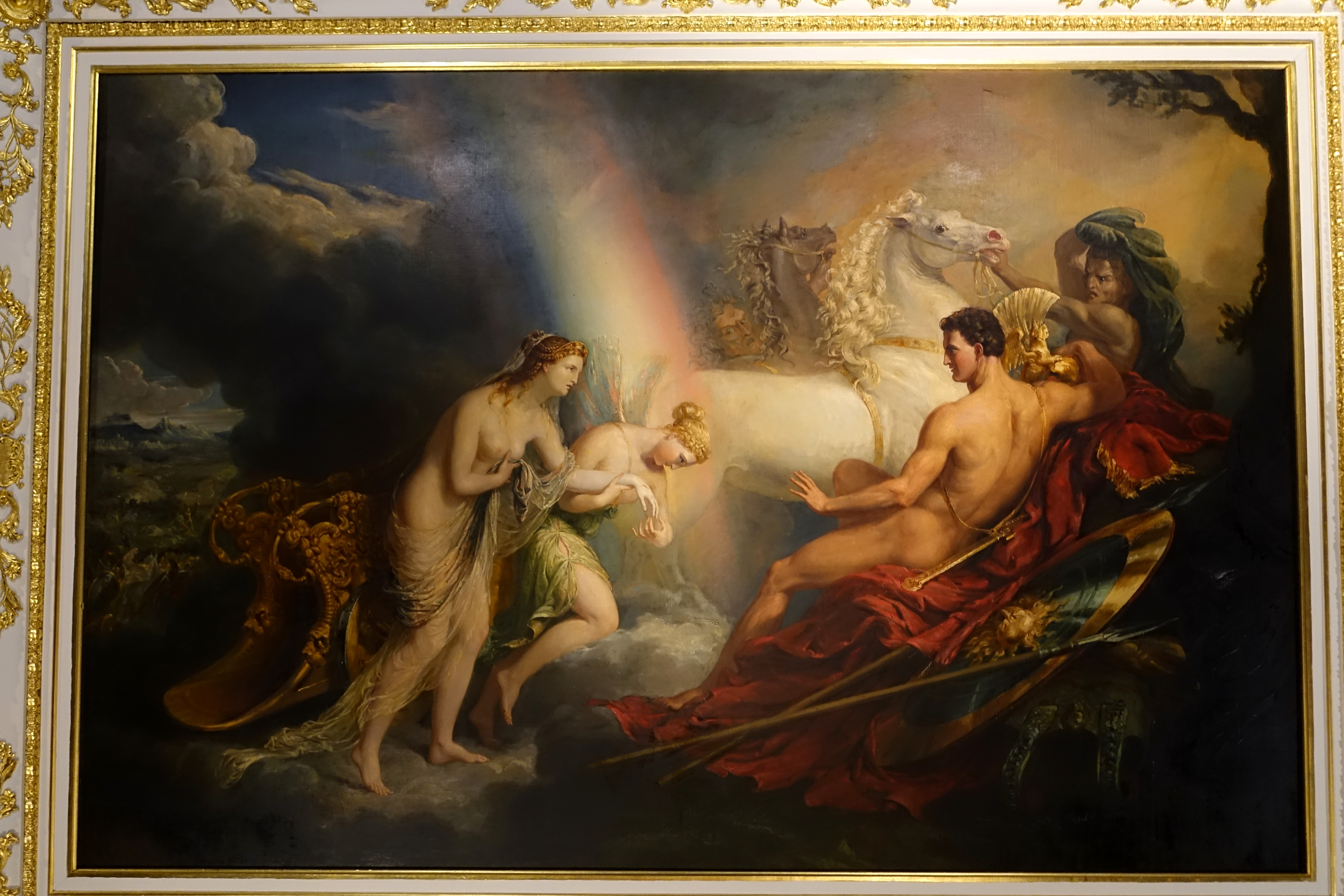
Venus, supported by Iris, complaining to Mars, by George Hayter. Exhibited RA in 1820 and winner of the Royal Academy Painting of the Year in 1823 (Chatsworth House)

Hayter was most productive and innovative during the 1820s. George Agar-Ellis (later Lord Dover) commissioned The Trial of Queen Caroline depicting George IV's attempt to divorce Queen Caroline in the House of Lords in 1820 (exh. Cauty's Great Rooms, 80-82 Pall Mall, 1823; London, National Portrait Gallery, London); painted on a large scale (2.33×2.66 m), Hayter's first (and most successful) contemporary history painting revealed a taste for high drama effectively realised. In the Trial of William, Lord Russell, in the Old Bailey in 1683 (1825; Woburn Abbey) Hayter celebrated John Russell's ancestry, in a work reminiscent of fashionable tableaux vivants of the country-house set.

== Return to the Continent ==
In 1826 Hayter settled in Italy. The Banditti of Kurdistan Assisting Georgians in Carrying off Circassian Women (untraced), completed in Florence for John Proby, 1st Earl of Carysfort (exhibited British Institution 1829), demonstrated Hayter's assimilation of the style and exotic subject-matter of contemporary French Romantic art.

In 1827 his mistress, Louisa Cauty, died after poisoning herself with arsenic. Although it was apparently an accident, in a bid for attention, it was widely assumed that he had driven her to suicide, and he was forced by the scandal to move from Florence to Rome.

By late 1828 he was in Paris, where his portraits of English society members (some exhibited at the Salon in 1831) were stylistically akin to the work of recent French portrait painters such as François Gérard.

== Royal patronage ==
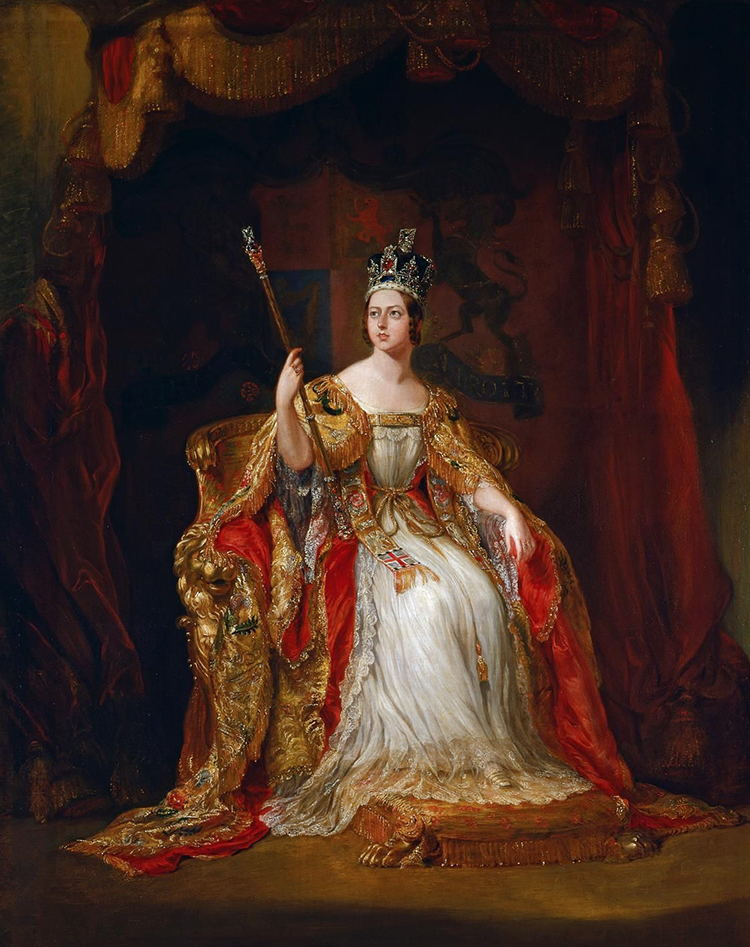
The State Portrait of Queen Victoria (Royal Collection)

In 1831 Hayter returned to England. His grandiose plan to paint the first sitting after the passage of the Reform Bill resulted in his painting Moving the Address to the Crown on the Opening of the First Reformed Parliament in the Old House of Commons, 5 February 1833 (1833–1843; London, N.P.G.), for which he executed nearly 400 portrait studies in oil. Hayter was an ardent supporter of the reform movement and this painting was not commissioned but to all intents and purposes a labour of love. It occupied him for ten years with no guarantee of financial reward. This is one of the last images executed of the interior of the old House of Commons before its destruction in the fire of 1834. The painting was finally purchased by the government for the nation in 1854, 20 years after it was started.

Having painted the young Princess Victoria (1832–3; destr.; oil sketch, Brit. Royal Col.), Hayter was not a surprising choice as the new Queen's 'Portrait and Historical Painter'. But on the death of Sir David Wilkie in 1841 Hayter's appointment as Principal Painter in Ordinary to the Queen caused some annoyance at the Royal Academy as this appointment had historically been the preserve of the President, then Sir Martin Archer Shee. In 1842 Hayter was knighted. He painted several royal ceremonies including Queen Victoria's coronation of 1838 and marriage of 1840 and also the Christening of the Prince of Wales of 1843 (all Brit. Royal Col.). He also painted several royal portraits including his most well-known work the State Portrait of the new Queen Victoria. Several versions of this portrait were done, with the assistance of the artist's son Angelo, to be sent as diplomatic gifts. Hayter's active period at court was short-lived, however, because Albert preferred German painters such as Franz Xaver Winterhalter.

Several significant examples of Hayter's works from this period remain a part of the Royal Collection, and both the State Portrait and Wedding painting are among those displayed to the public at Buckingham Palace. There is also a full-scale version of the State Portrait in the National Portrait Gallery and smaller copy at Holyrood Palace.

== Later years ==
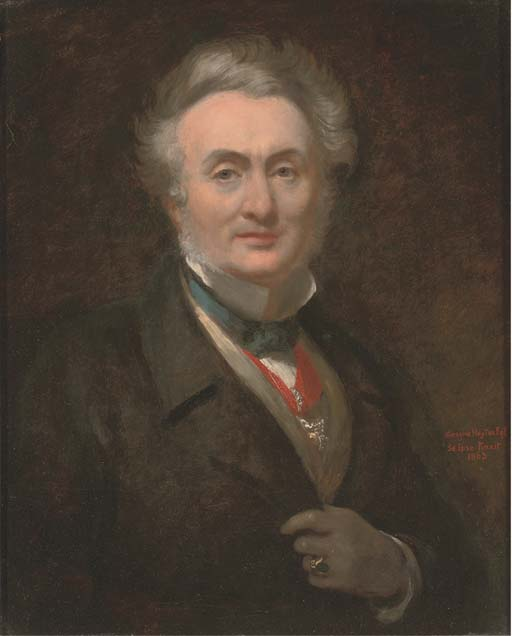
Self-portrait of Sir George Hayter in 1863 (Private Coll.)

Now in his fifties, Hayter struggled with his health and debts and he sold his Old Masters and other art works at Christie's in May 1845. He planned to move back to the continent but could not after he received severe leg injuries in July 1845 train accident. His wife, Sarah, died in 1844, and on 12 May 1846 he married (Helena) Cecilia Hyde, née Burke (1791/2–1860). After she died in 1860, Hayter married Martha Carey, née Miller (1818–1867) on 23 April 1863. By the mid-1840s Hayter's portrait style was considered old-fashioned. He adjusted his type of history painting to suit the more literal taste of the early Victorian era (e.g. Wellington Viewing Napoleon's Effigy at Madame Tussaud's; destr. 1925; engraving, 1854).

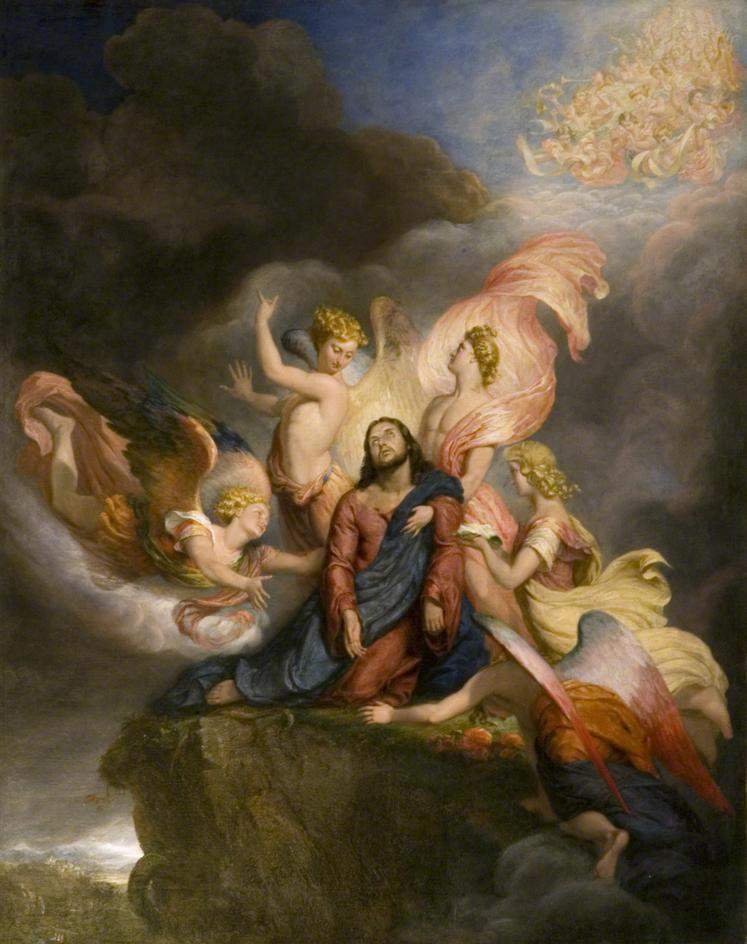
The Angels Ministering to Christ, 1849 (V&A)

Hayter painted several large religious paintings including two depicting important Reformist events, Bishop Latimer Preaching at Paul's Cross and The Martyrdom of Bishops Ridley and Latimer (exh. 1855), both of which were given to Princeton University Art Museum, USA in 1984. He painted several biblical scenes from the Old and New Testament, among them The Angels Ministering to Christ in 1849 (V&A) and Joseph Interpreting the Baker's Dream in 1854 (Lancaster City Museum). He also produced fluent landscape watercolours (many of Italian views), etchings (he published a volume in 1833), decorative designs and sculpture.

On 18 January 1871 Hayter died at his home in London. He was buried in St Marylebone cemetery in East Finchley. The contents of Hayter's studio were auctioned at Christie's, London, on 19 April 1871.

His younger brother, John Hayter (1800–1895), was also an artist, known chiefly as a portrait draughtsman in chalks and crayons and his younger sister Anne worked as a miniaturist. Some sources say that Stanley William Hayter was a direct descendant of John Hayter, while others say the ancestor was Sir George Hayter himself. On the other hand, the Hayter pedigree in Visitation of England and Wales contradicts these claims. What is known for certain is that the French painter and writer, Jean René Bazaine was a great-great-grandson of George Hayter, through his eldest daughter Georgiana Elizabeth, who married Pierre-Dominique Bazaine older brother of Marshal Bazaine. The exiled Marshal Bazaine stayed at the Hayters' house, 14 Harewood Square, London NW, in the mid-1870s (the square was demolished in the 1890s to make way for Marylebone Station).

== Gallery ==
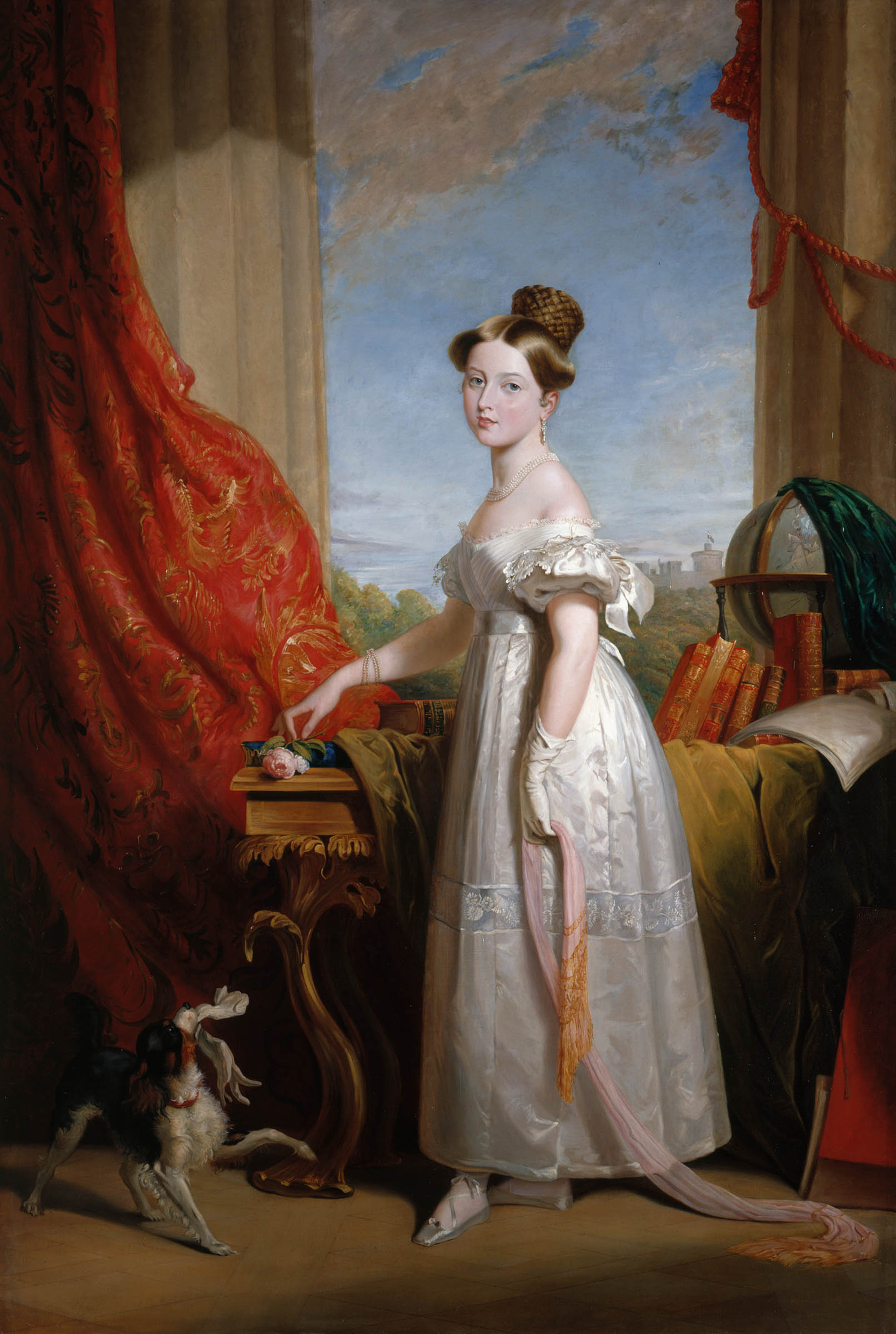
Princess Victoria painted 1833

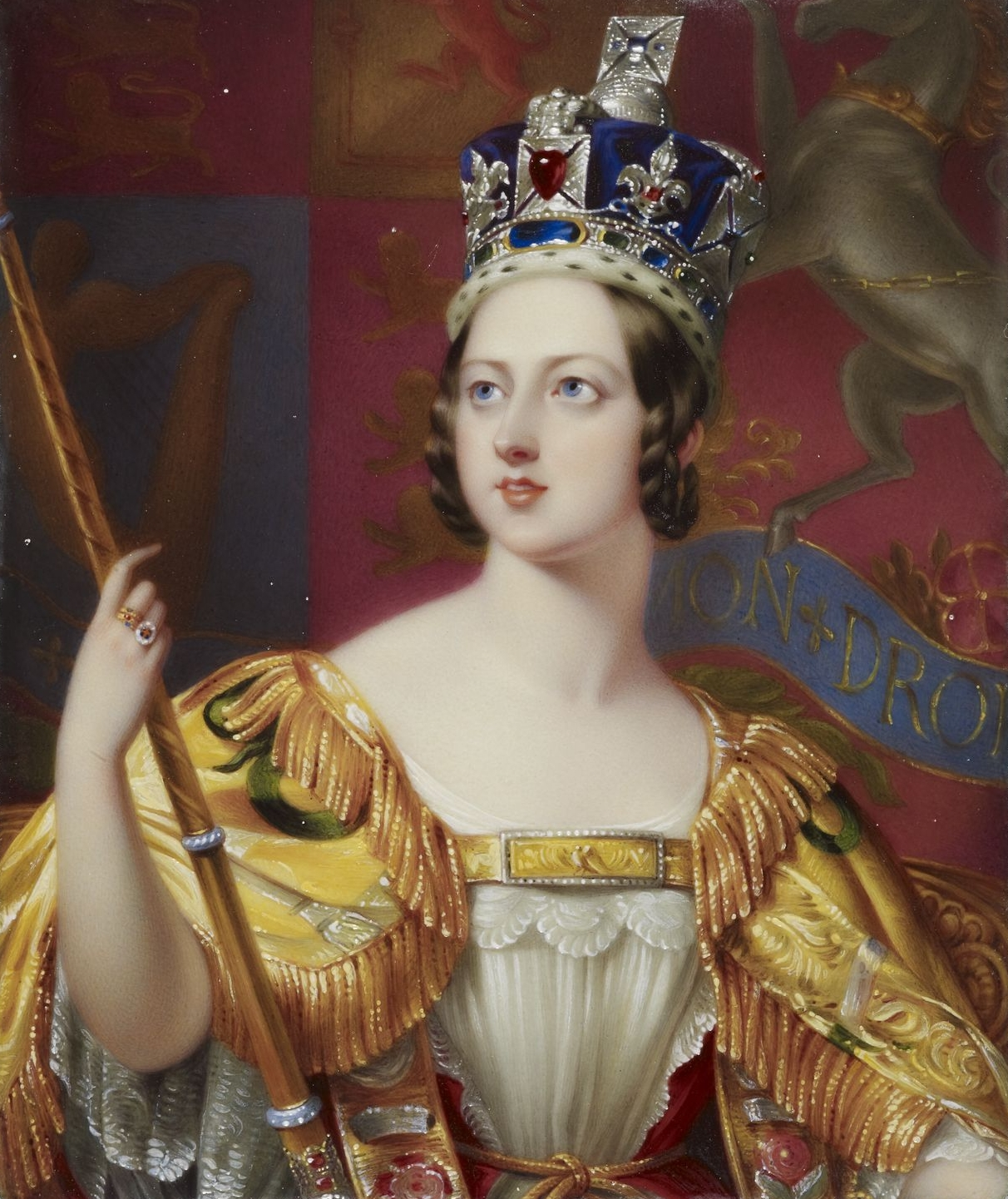
Detail from State Portrait of Queen Victoria 1837

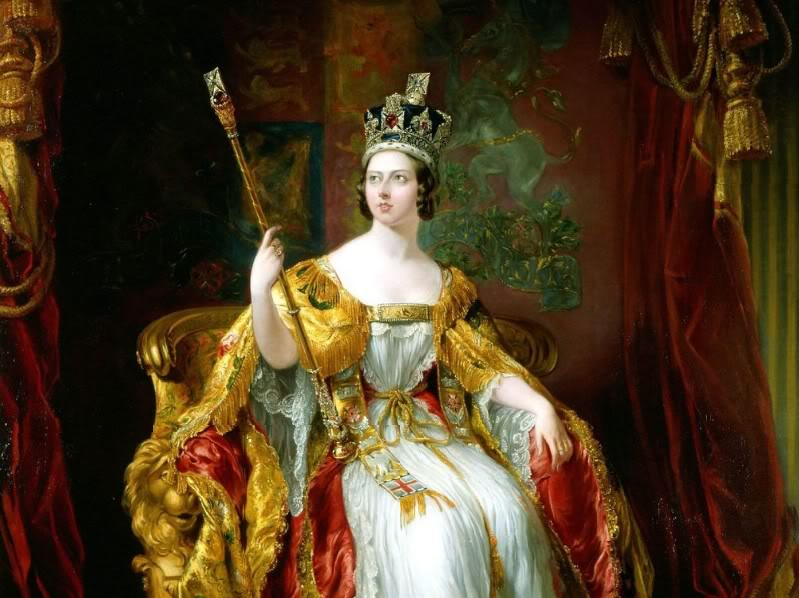
State Portrait of Queen Victoria 1837

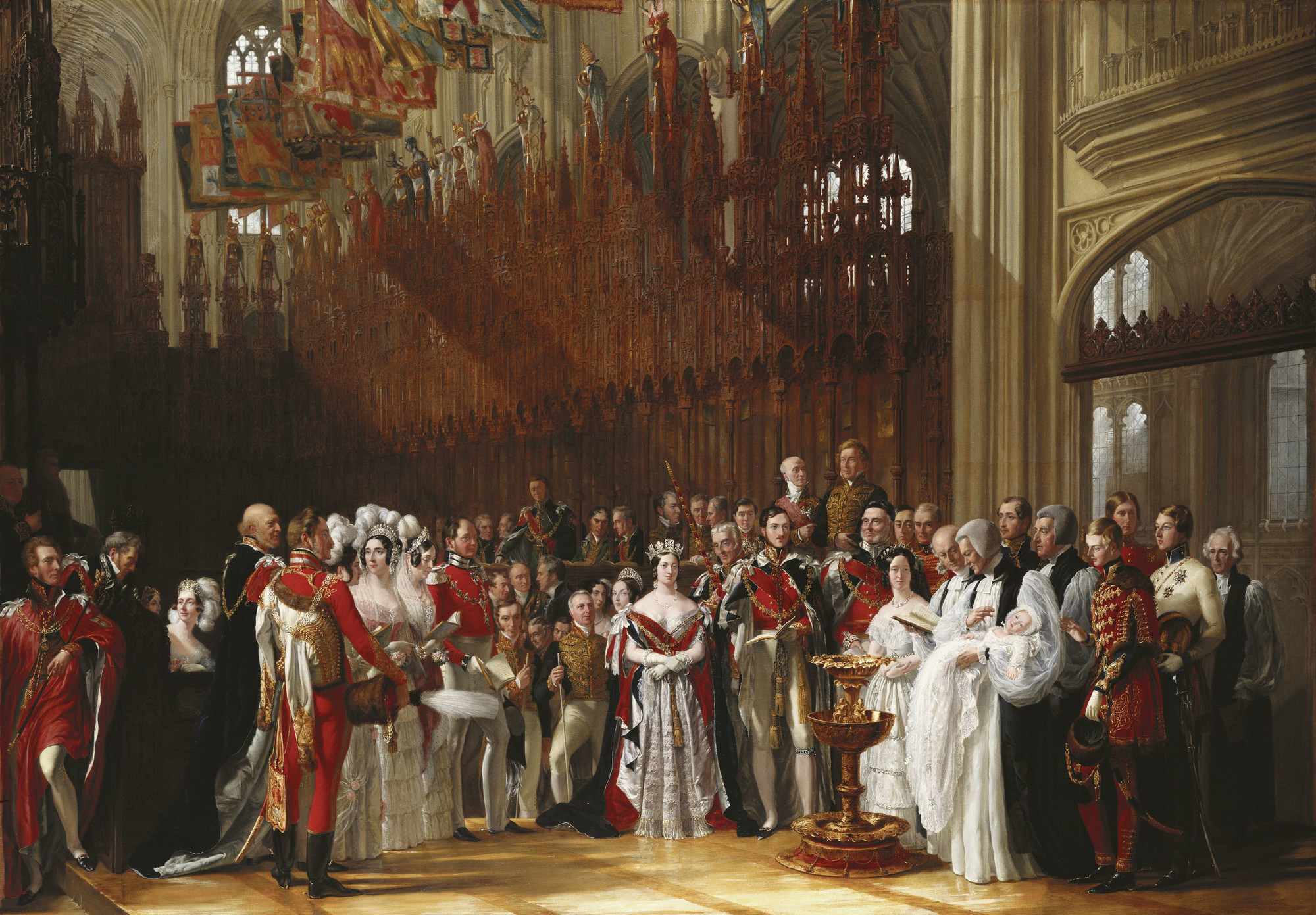
The Christening of the Prince of Wales in St. George's Chapel, Windsor 25 Jan 1842

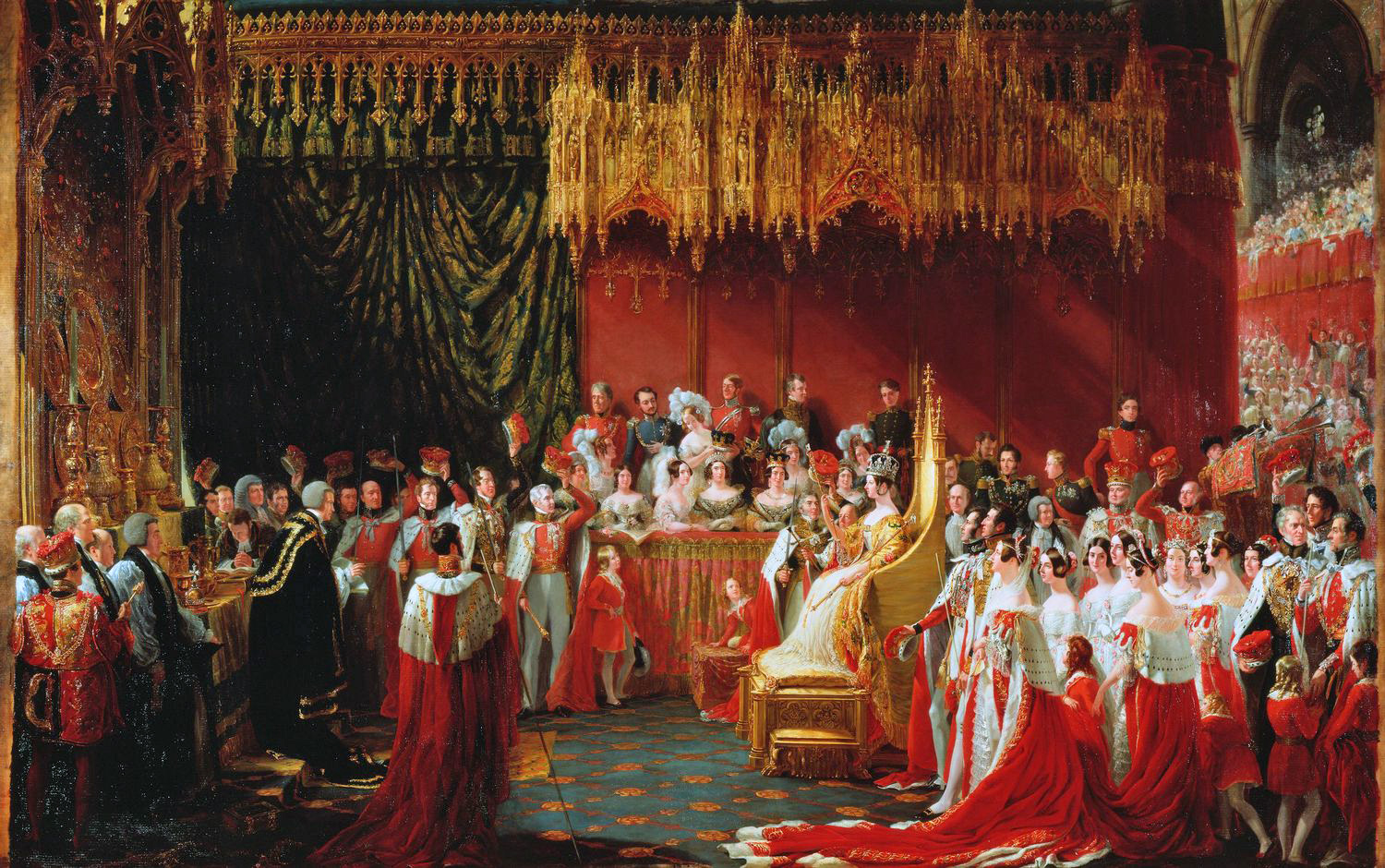
Coronation of Queen Victoria 28 June 1838

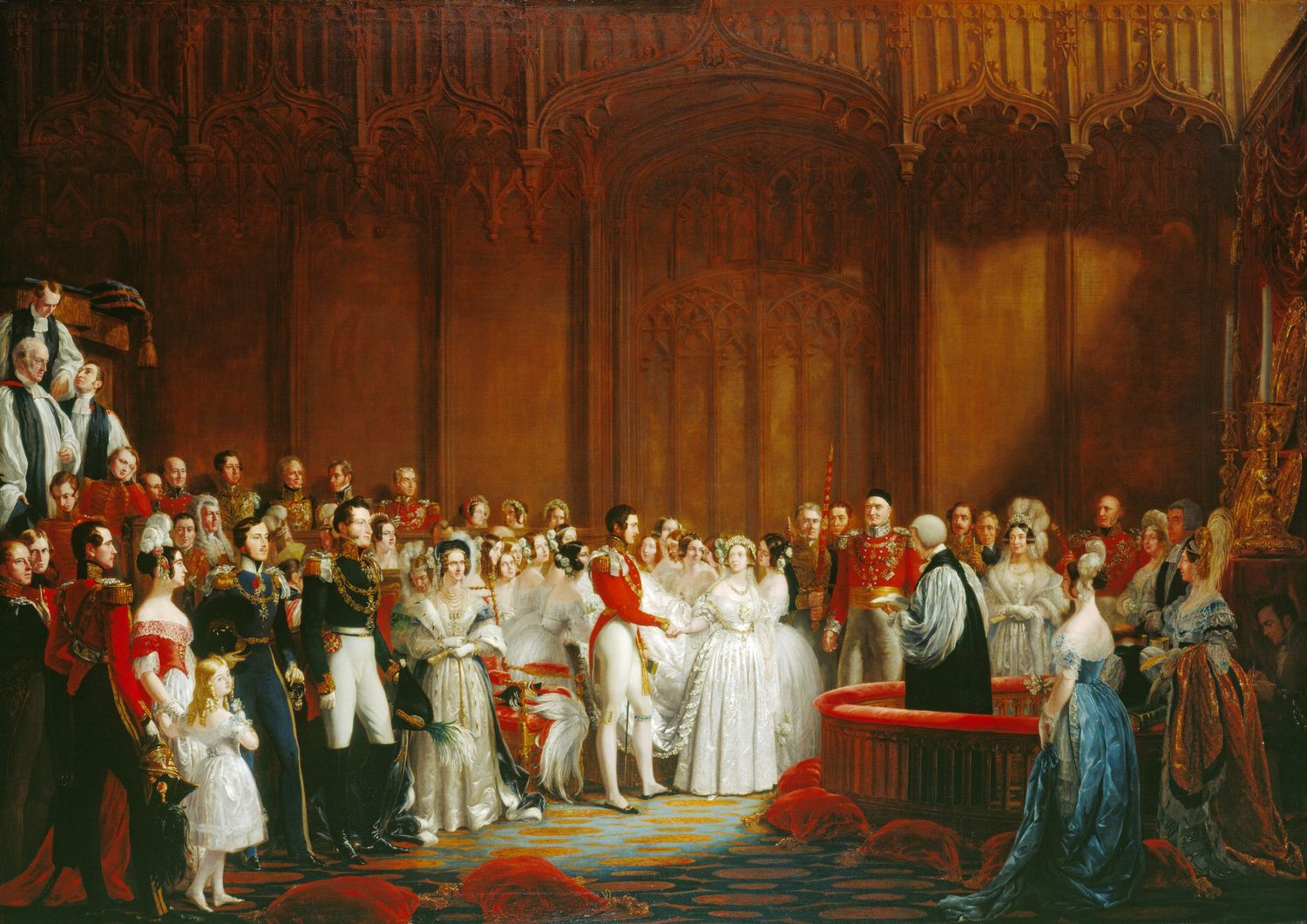
Marriage of Victoria and Albert, 10 February 1840

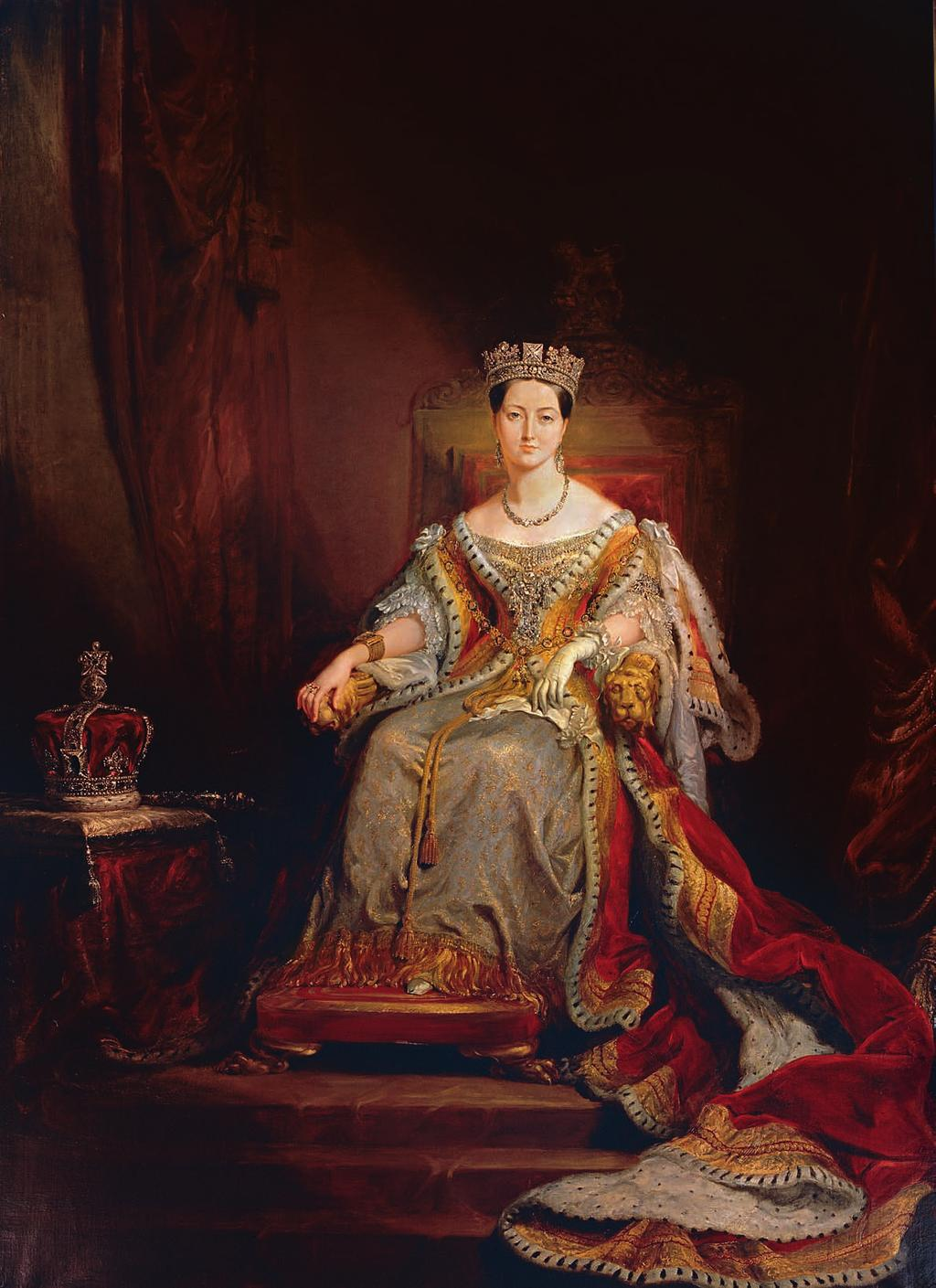
Queen Victoria Enthroned in the House of Lords 1838

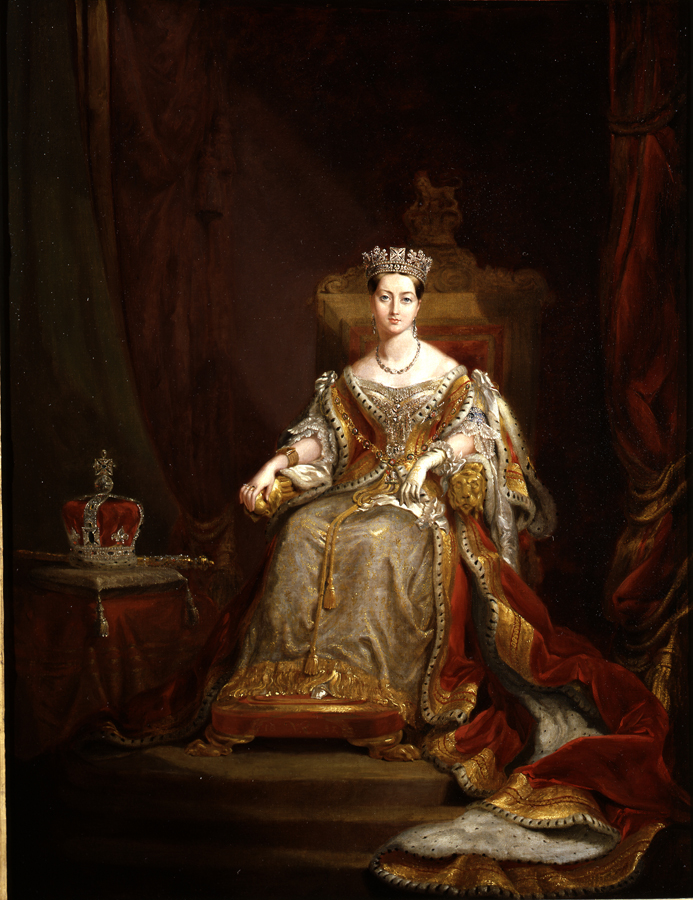
Queen Victoria seated on the throne in the House of Lords 1838 (copy commissioned by Madamme Tussauds)

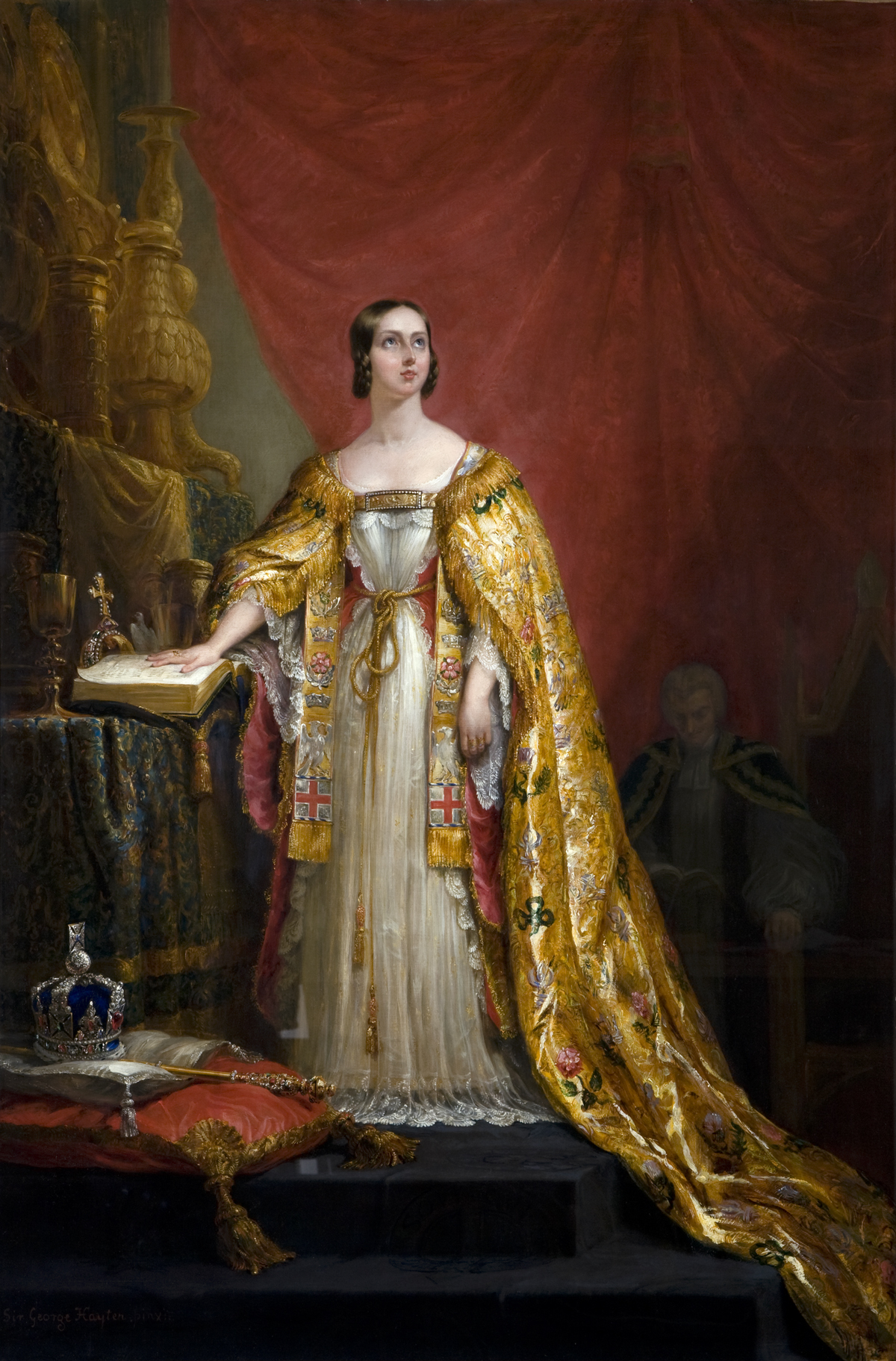
Queen Victoria taking the Coronation Oath 1838

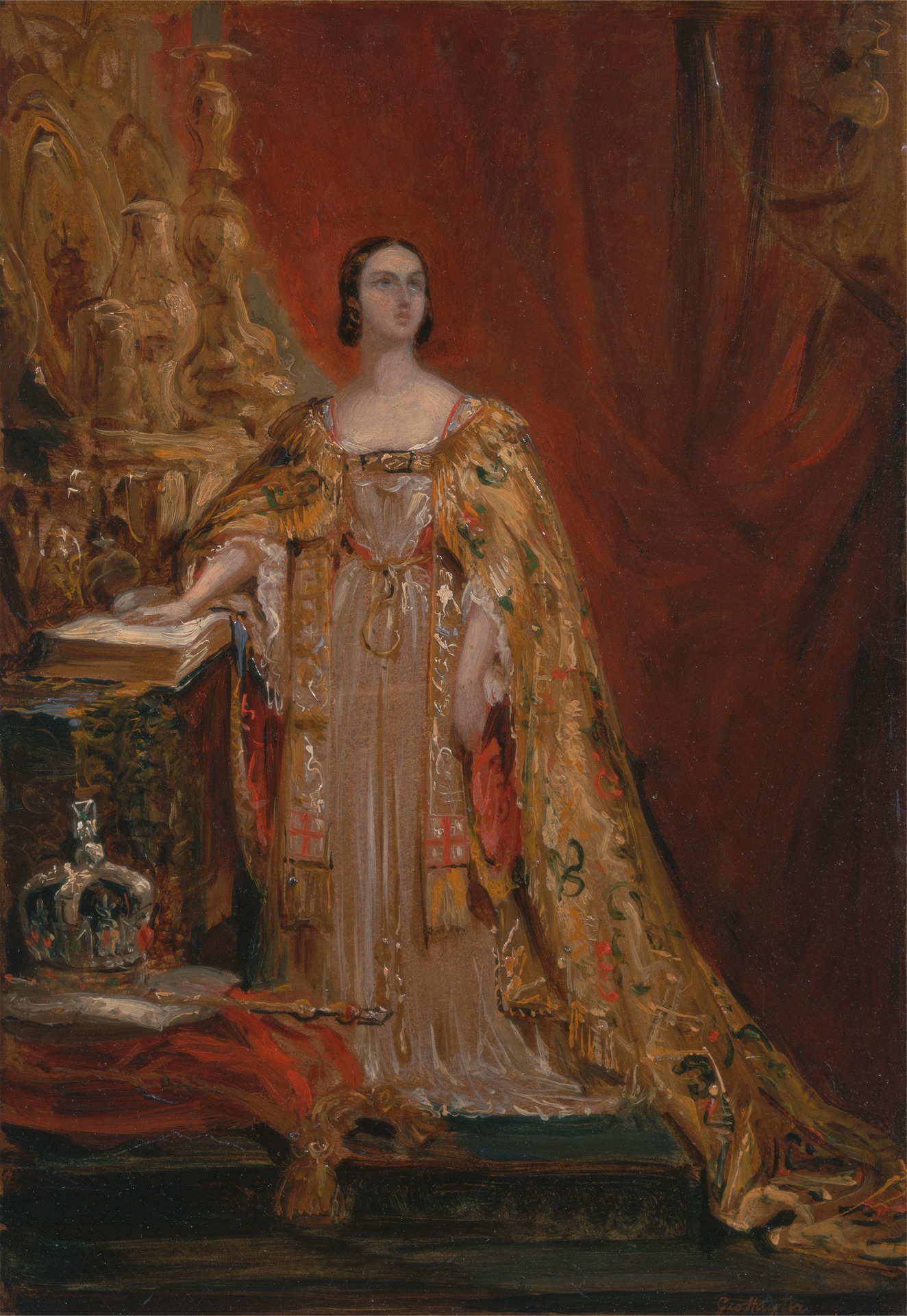
Queen Victoria taking the Coronation Oath

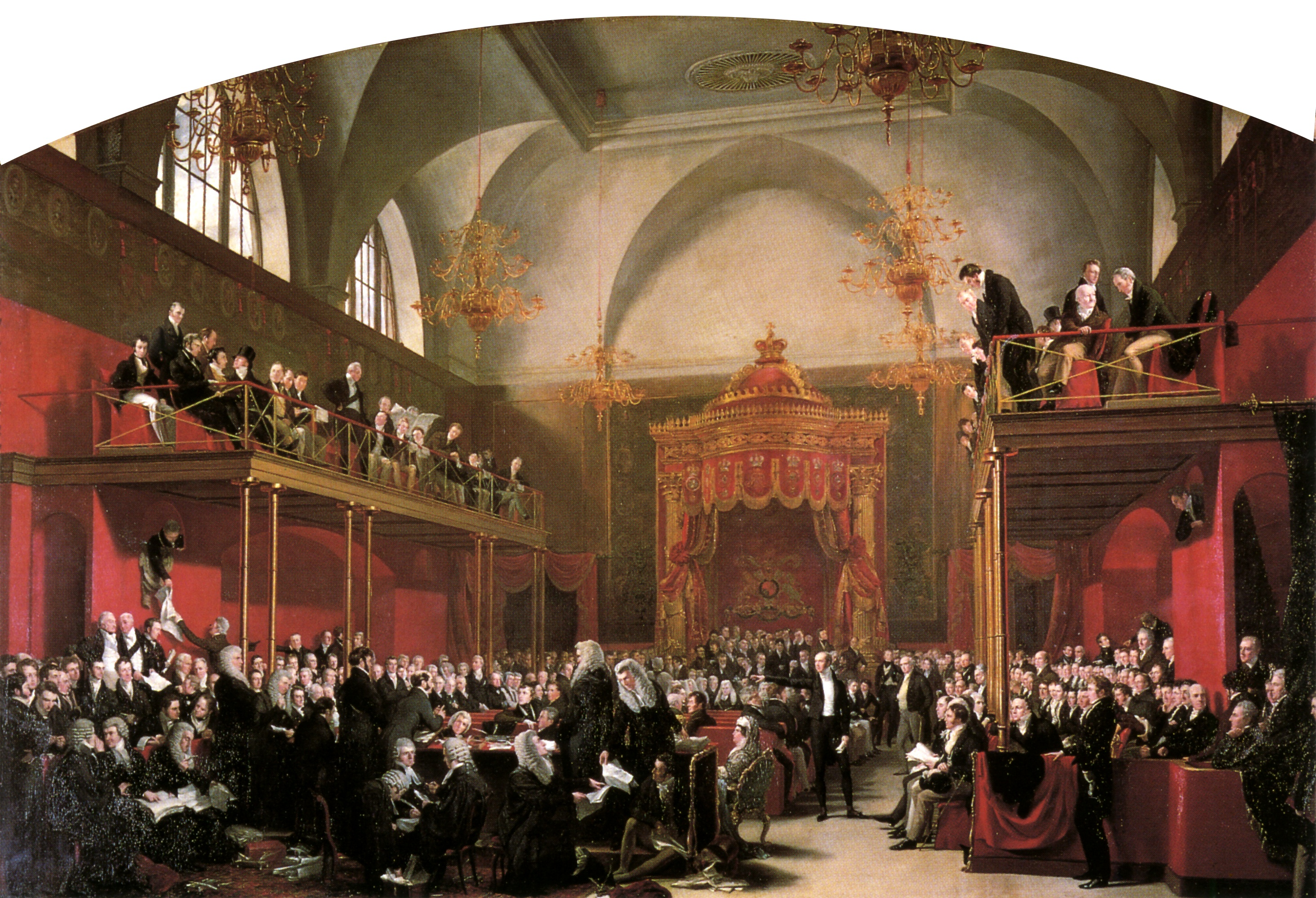
The Trial of Queen Caroline in the House of Lords 1820 (188 portraits), completed 1823

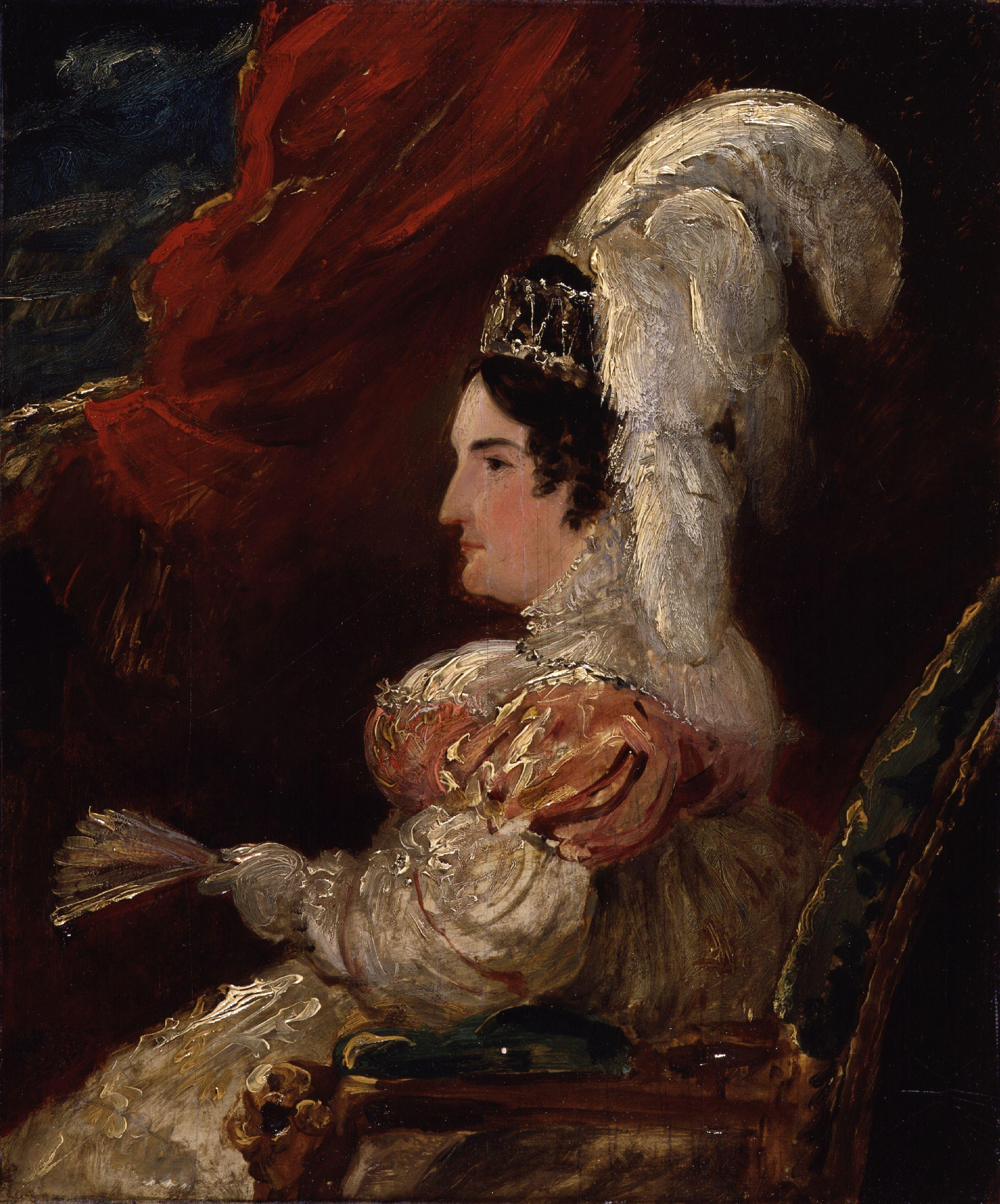
Queen Caroline, wife of George IV during her trial, 1820

The Trial of William Lord Russell in 1683, 1825

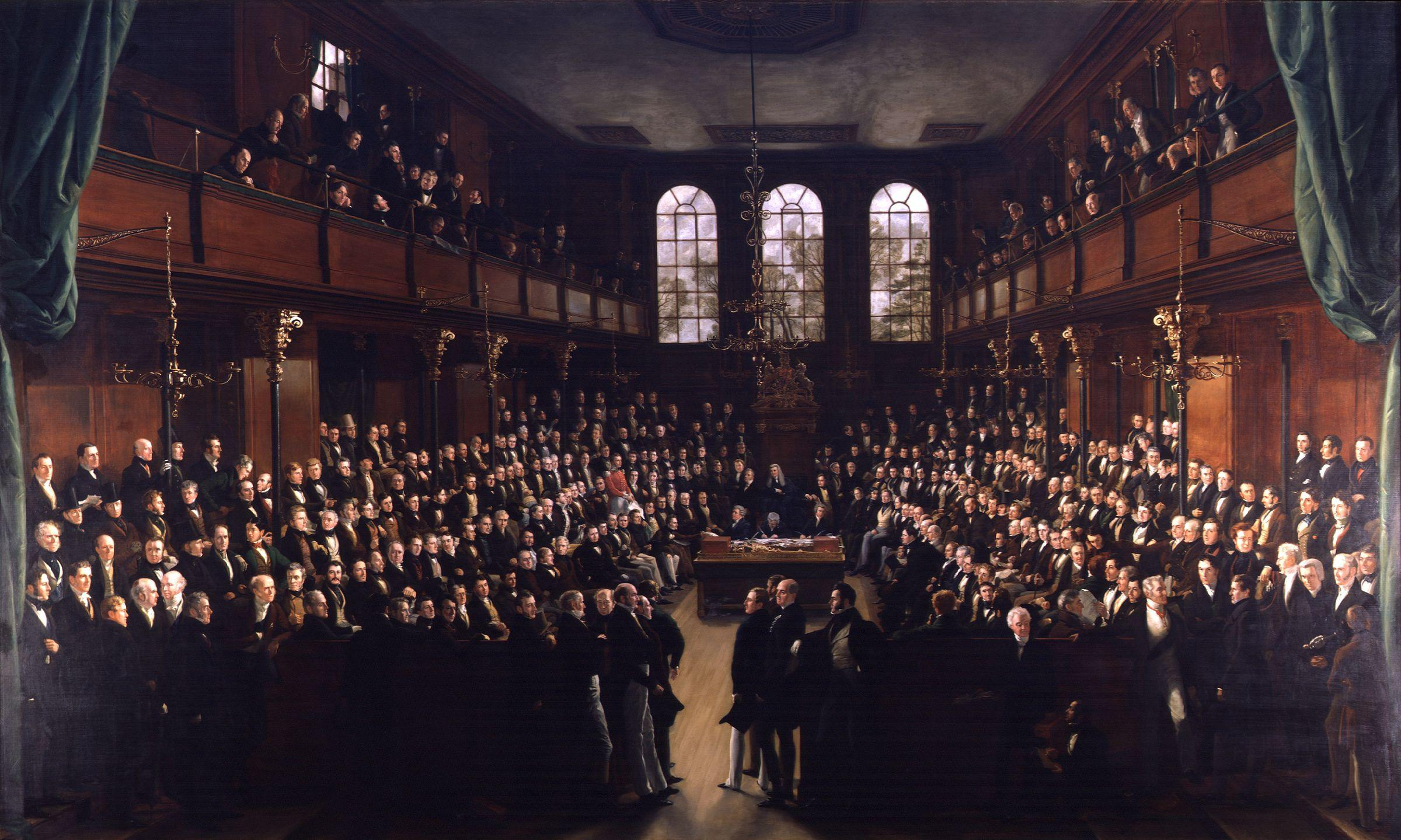
The House of Commons, 1833 (375 portraits)

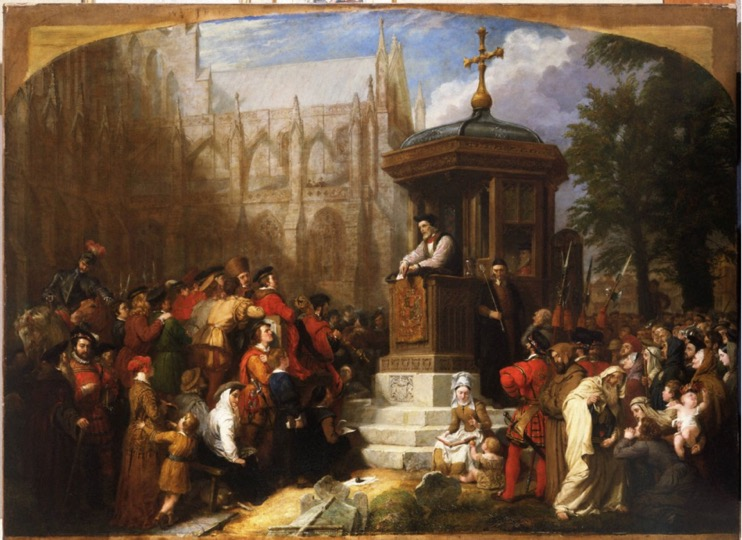
Latimer preaching at St.Paul's cross, 1855

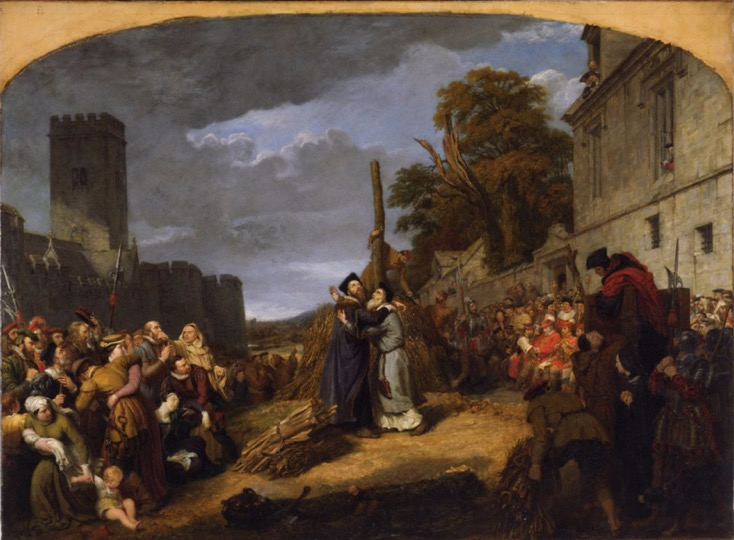
The Martydom of Ridley and Latimer, 1855

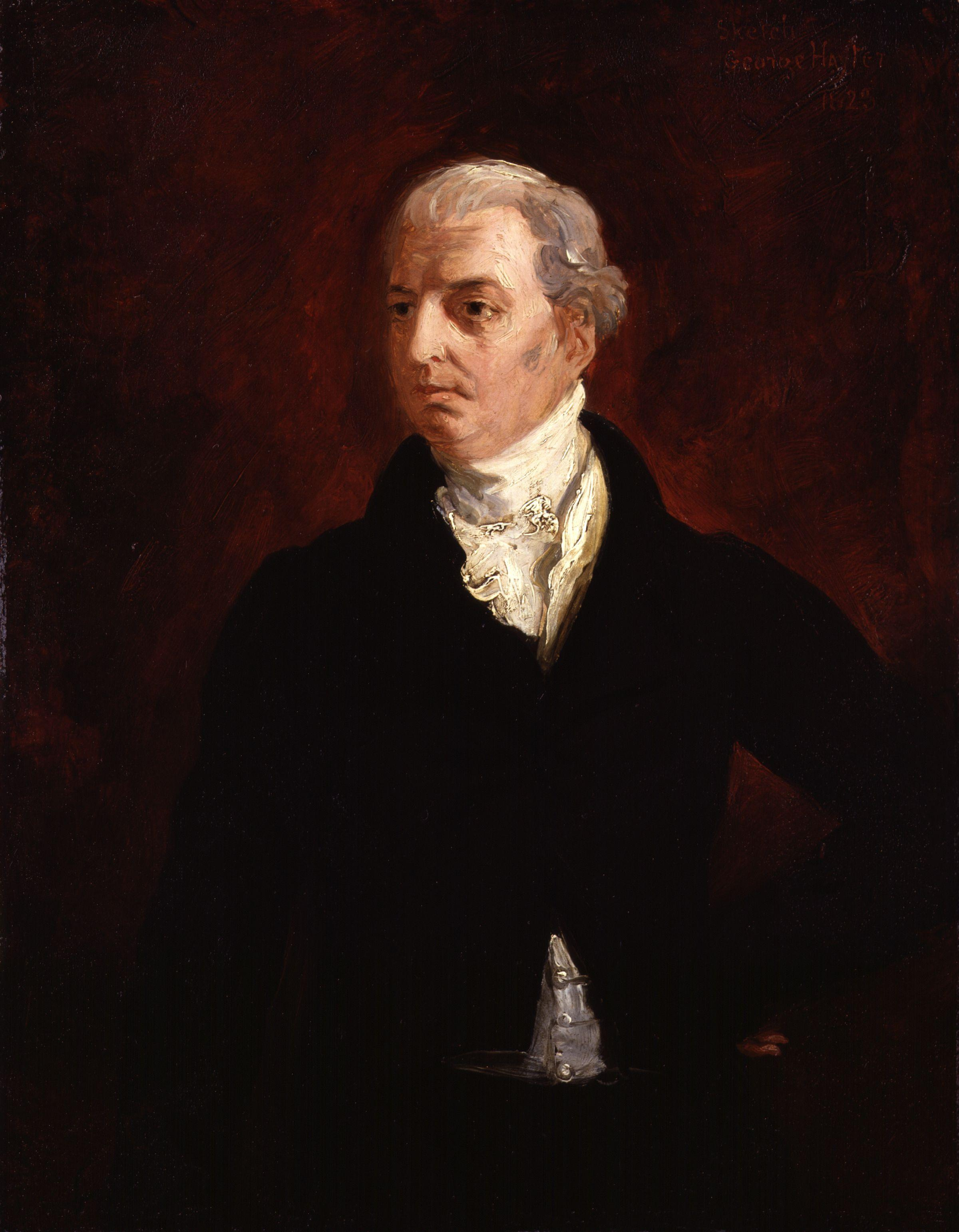
Robert Jenkinson, 2nd Earl of Liverpool and Prime Minister, 1823 (for Trial of Queen Caroline picture)

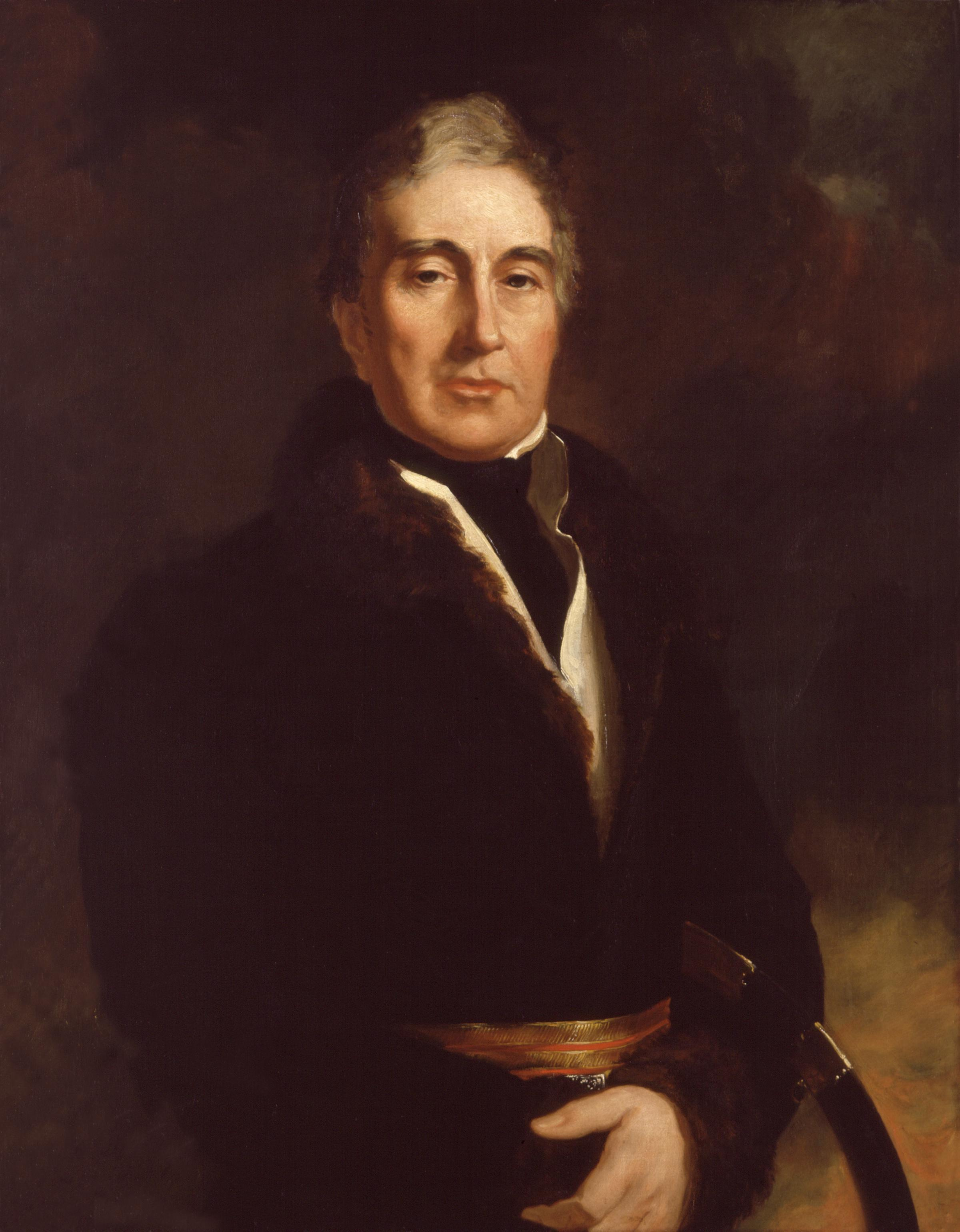
General Thomas Graham, 1st Baron Lynedoch 1823

William Cavendish, 6th Duke of Devonshire c.1822-26

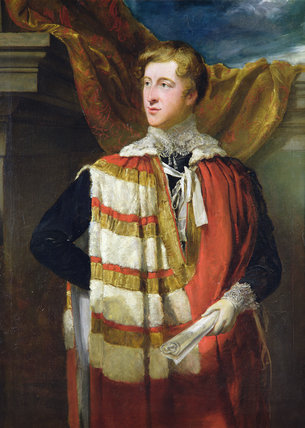
William Cavendish, 6th Duke of Devonshire c.1822-26

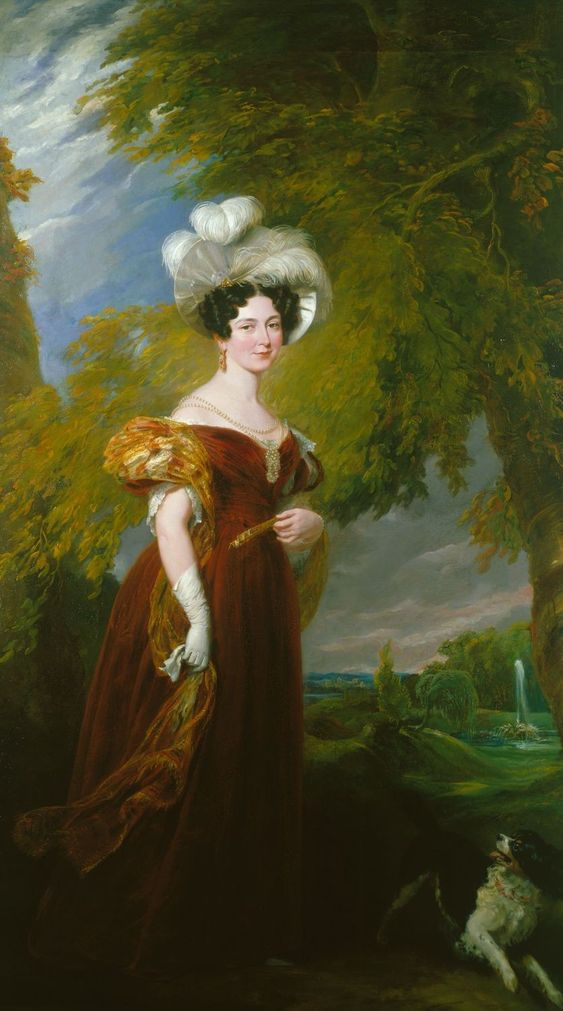
Duchess of Kent (mother of Queen Victoria), 1835

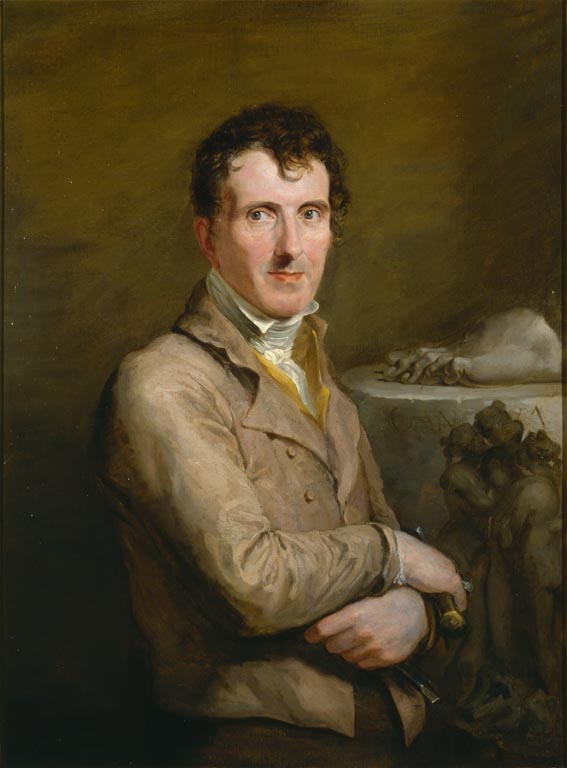
Antonio Canova painted in 1817

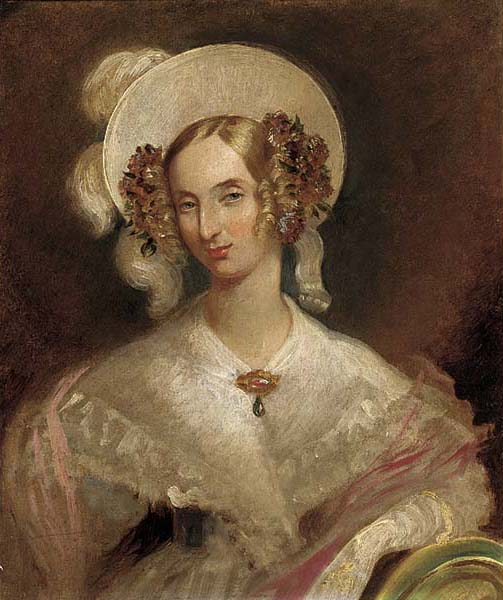
Queen Louise of Belgium, Windsor 1837

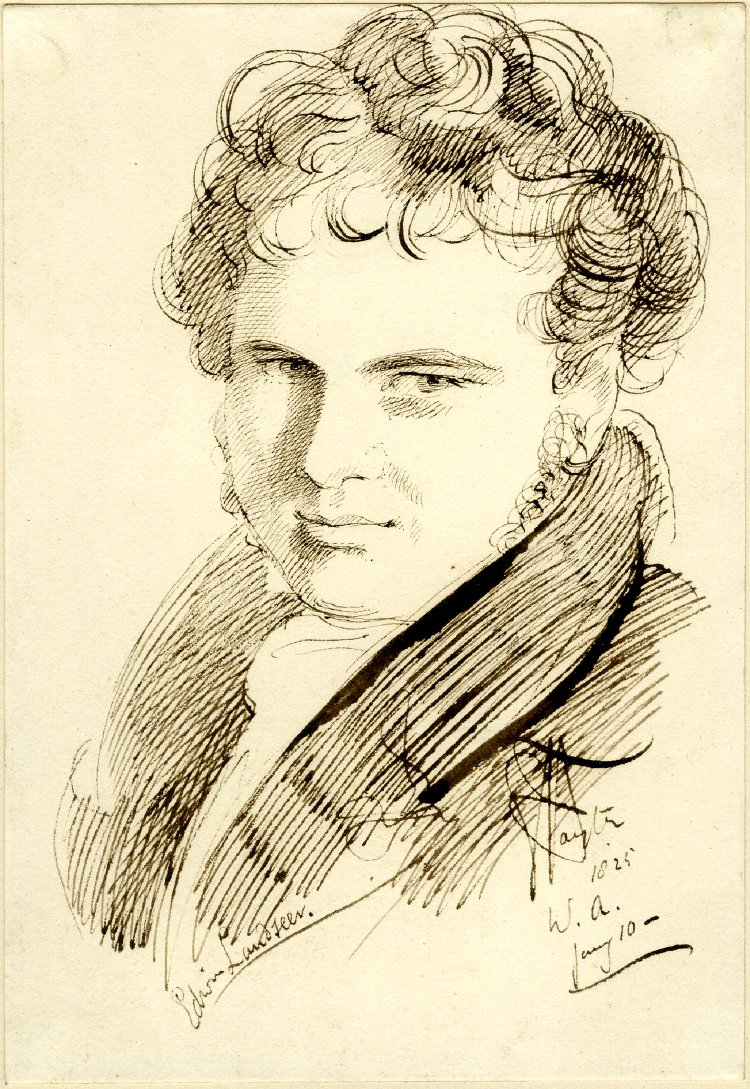
Edwin Landseer drawn in 1825

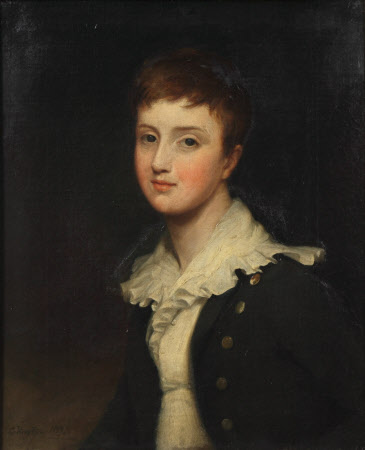
Lord Richard Cavendish as a boy, painted in 1825

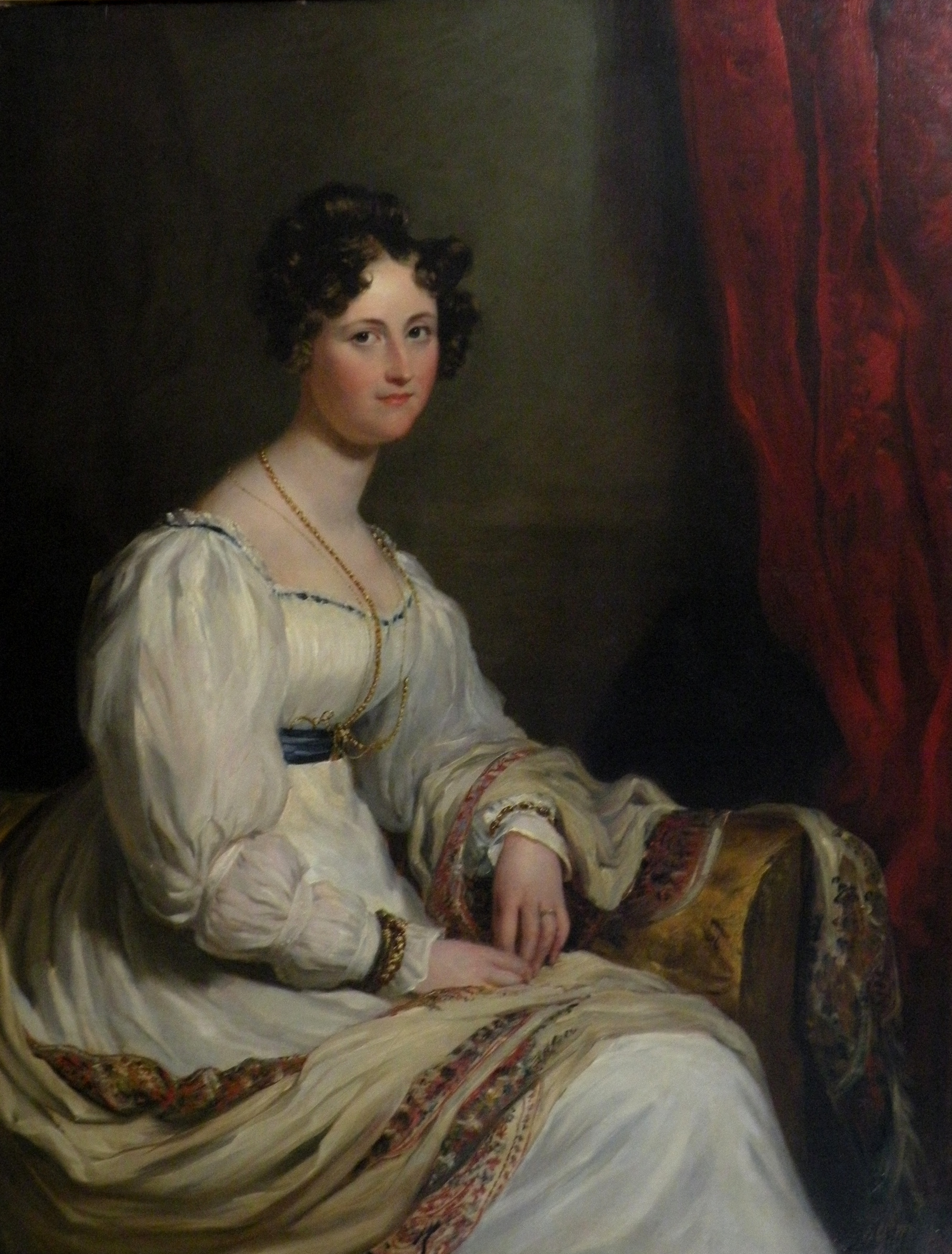
Portrait of a young lady in an interior 1826

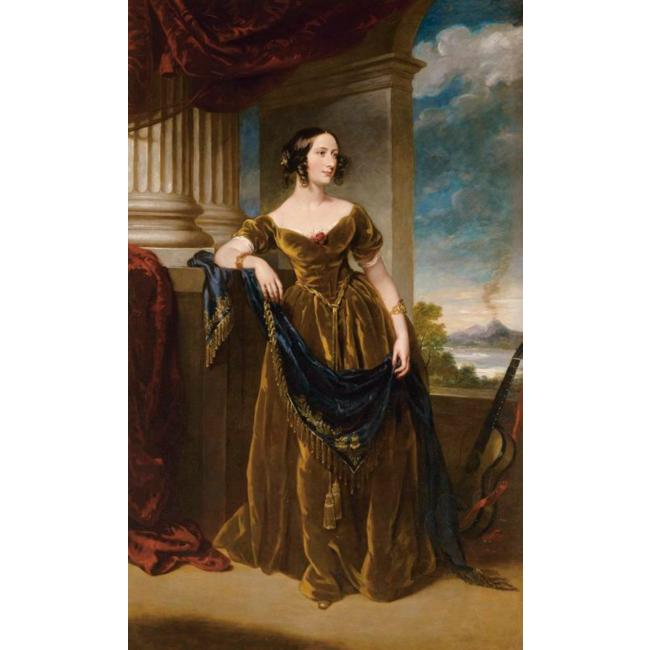
Portrait of a Lady, Naples 1828

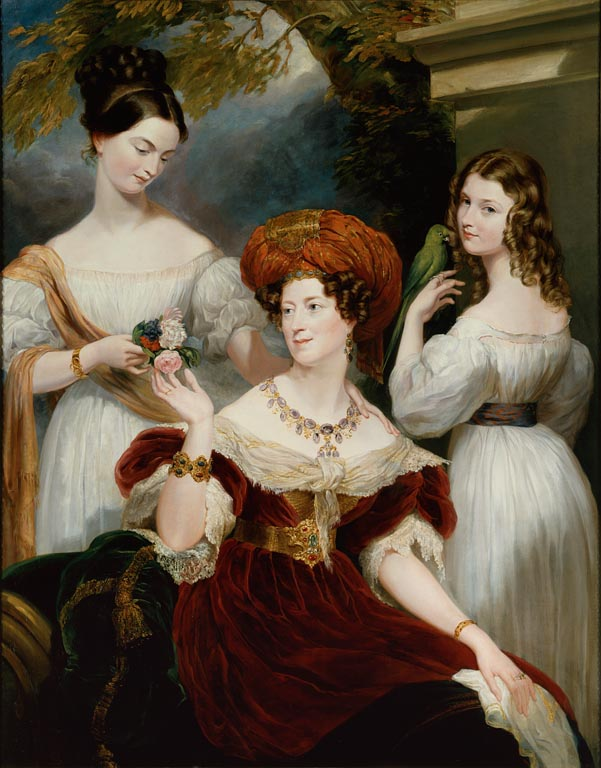
Lady Stuart de Rothesay and her daughters, Paris 1830

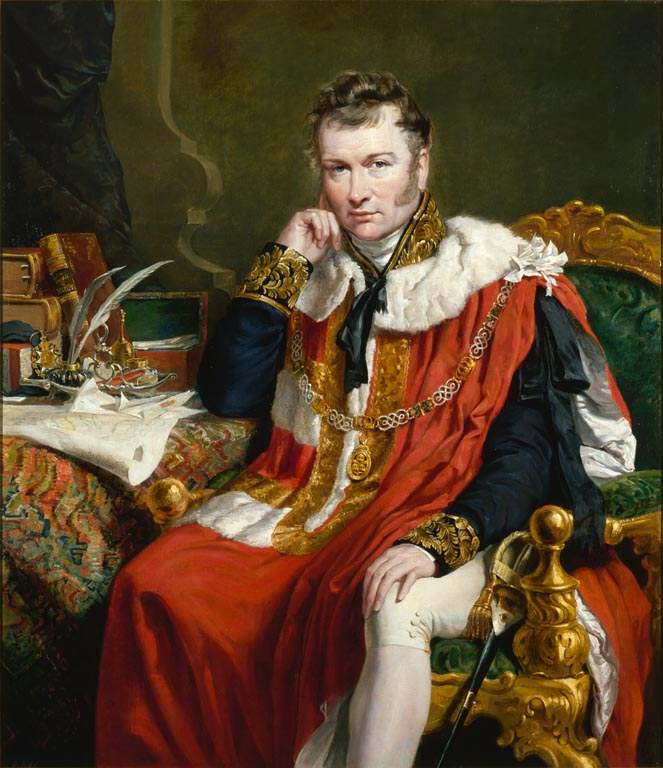
Lord Stuart de Rothesay, British Ambassador to France, Paris 1830

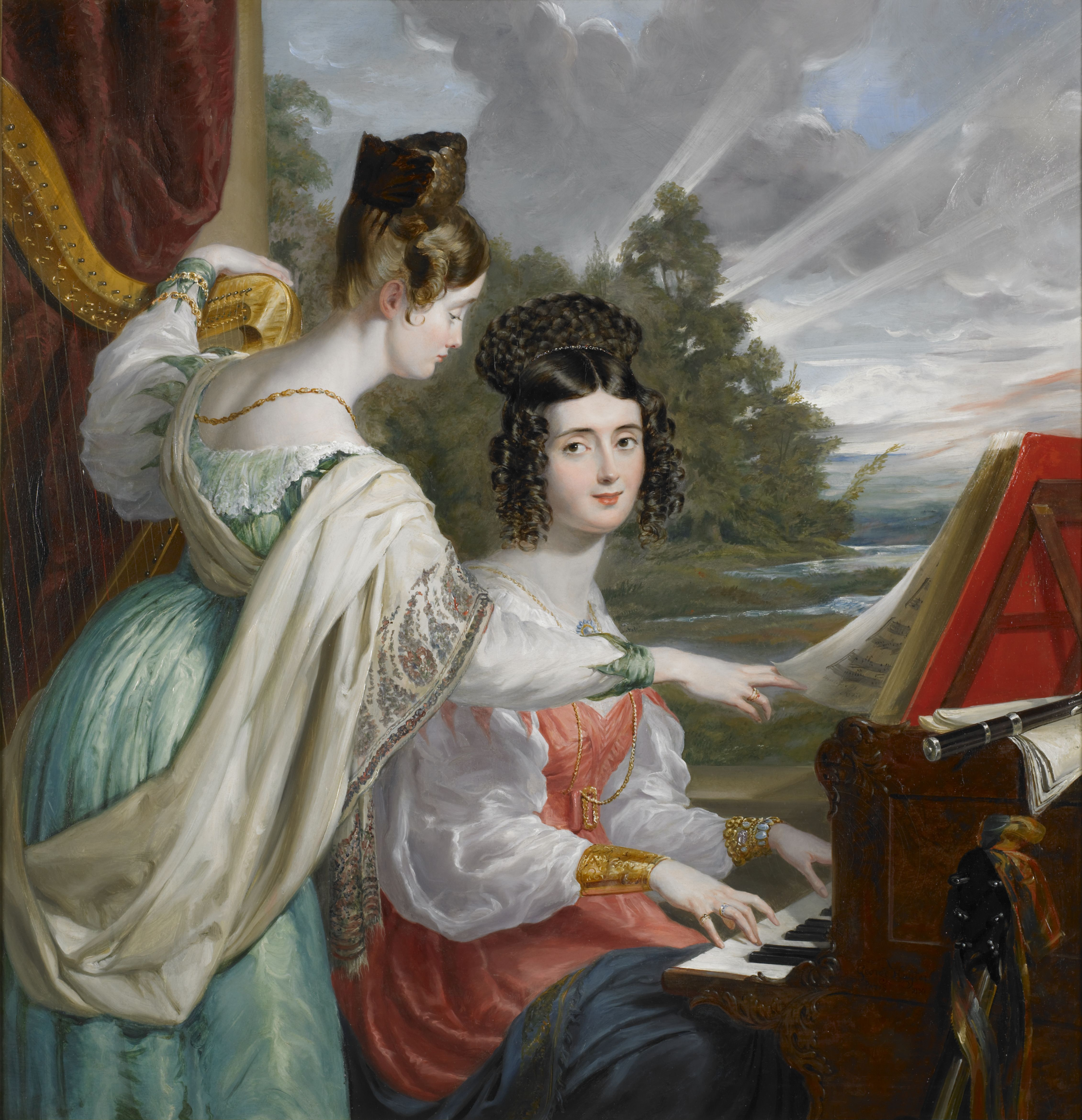
The Hon. Charlotte and The Hon. Louisa Stuart, daughters of Baron Stuart de Rothesay, Paris 1830

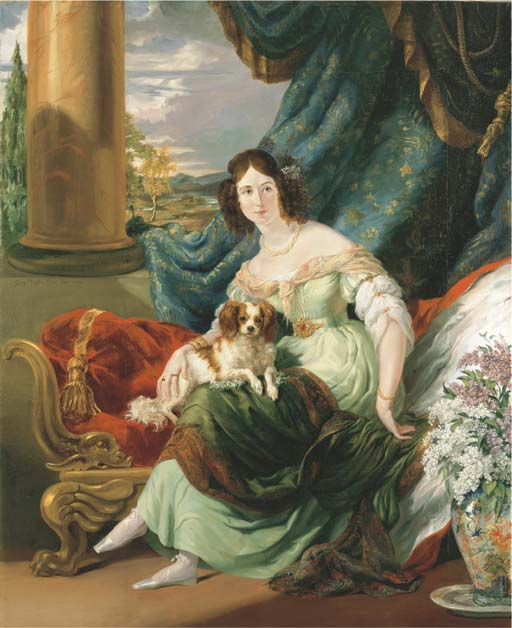
Charlotte, Countess de la Bourdonnaye (1795–1875) Paris 1830

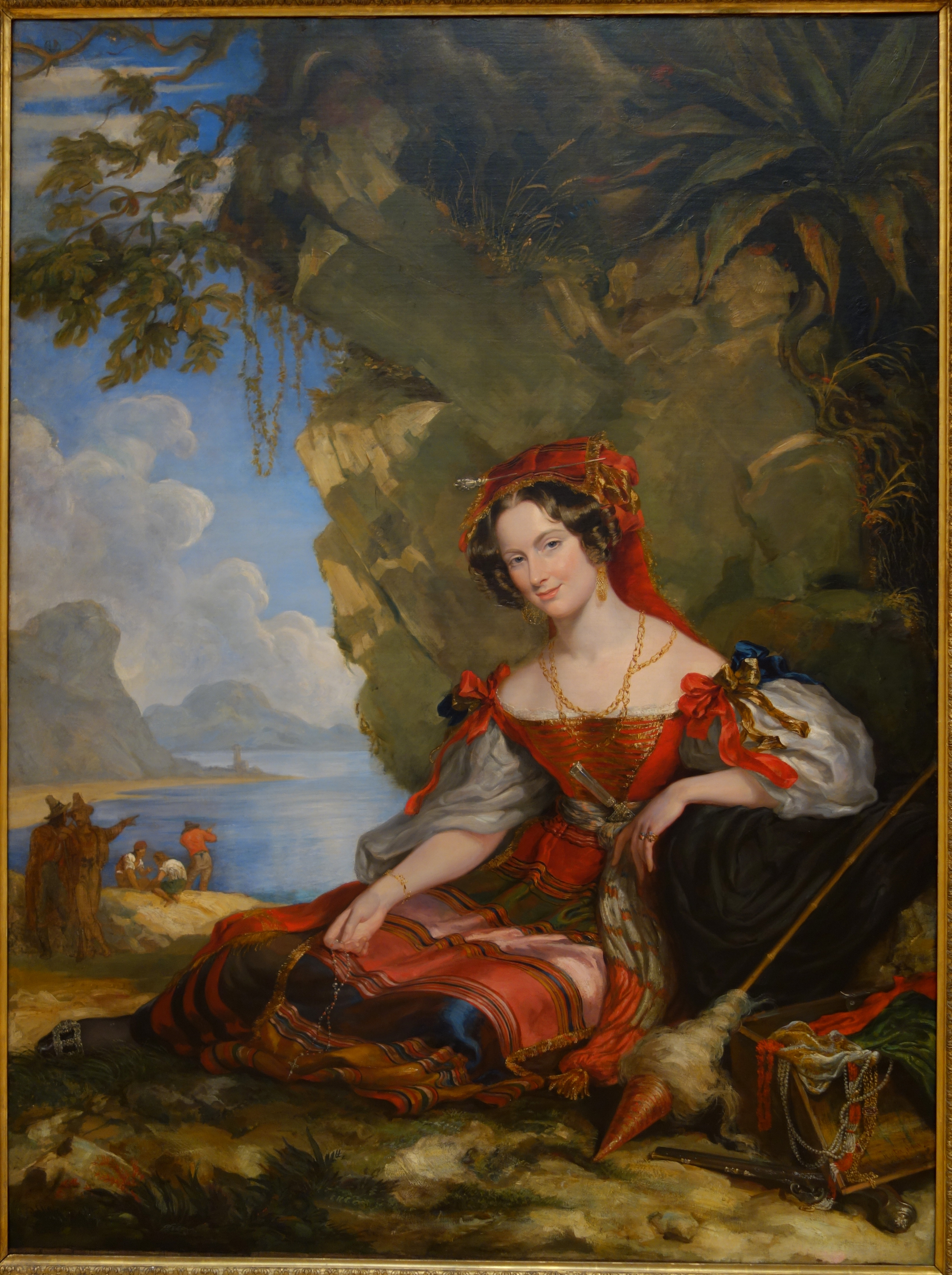
Portrait of Lady Caroline Montagu, 1831

Saith Satoor and Ali Hassan Bey, 1831. Saith Satoor was the protégé of Prince Abbas Mirza, Crown Prince of Persia

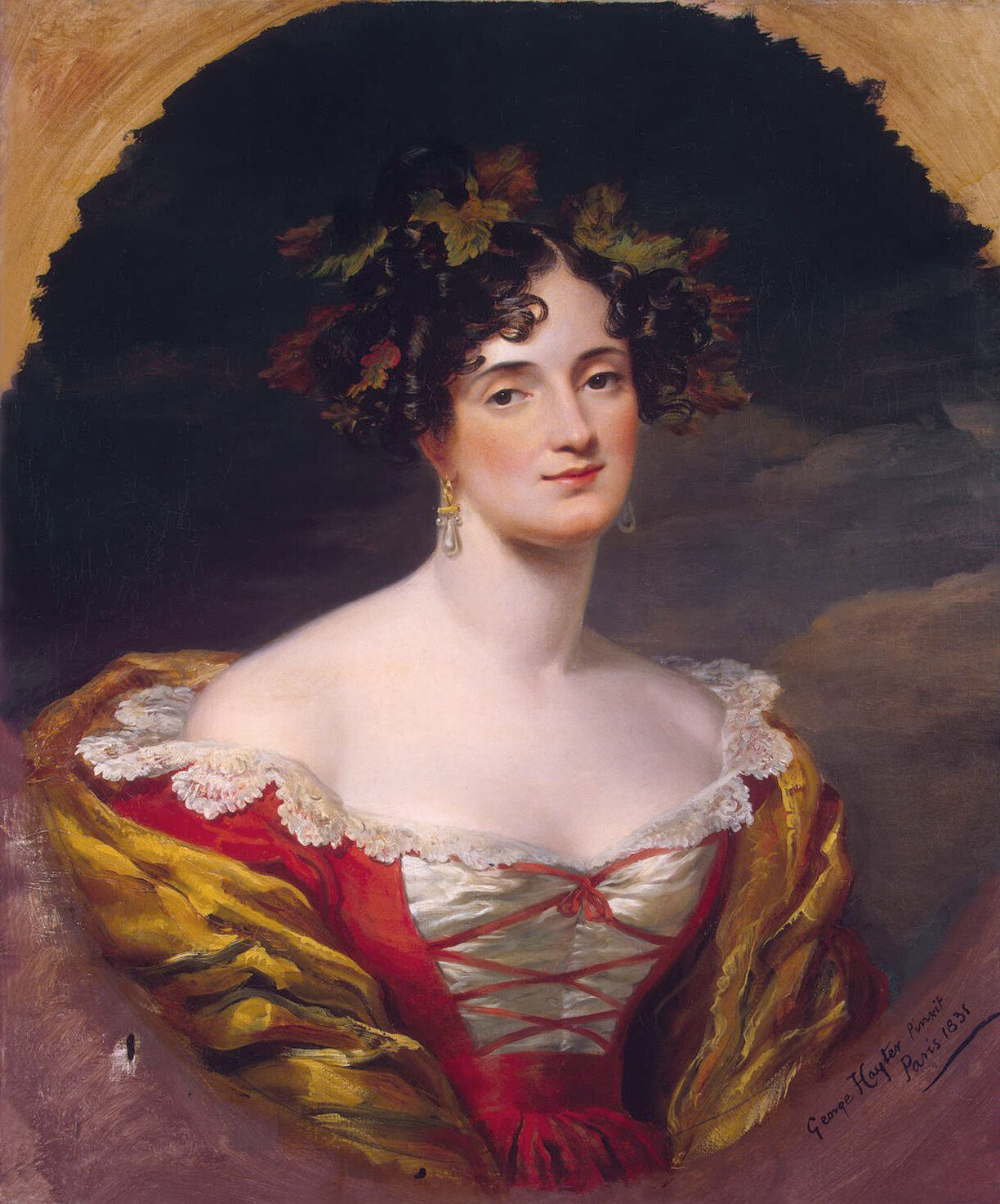
Sofia Kiselyova, daughter of Count Stanislav Potocki 1831

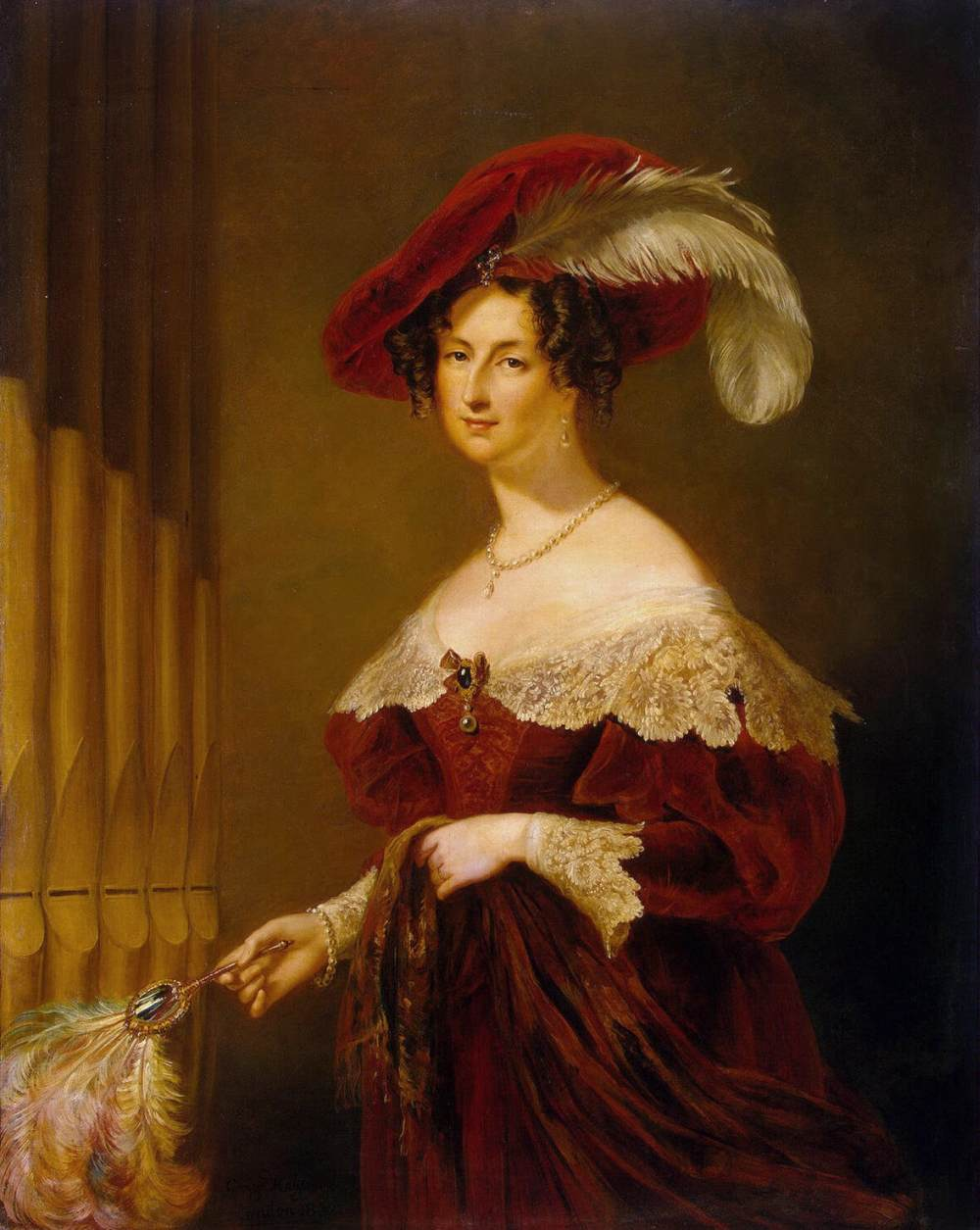
Countess Elizabeth Vorontsova (1792–1880) 1832

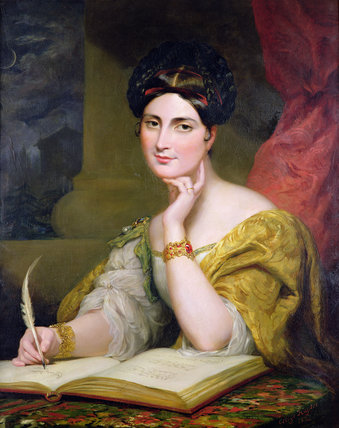
The Hon. Mrs. Caroline Norton, society beauty and author, 1832

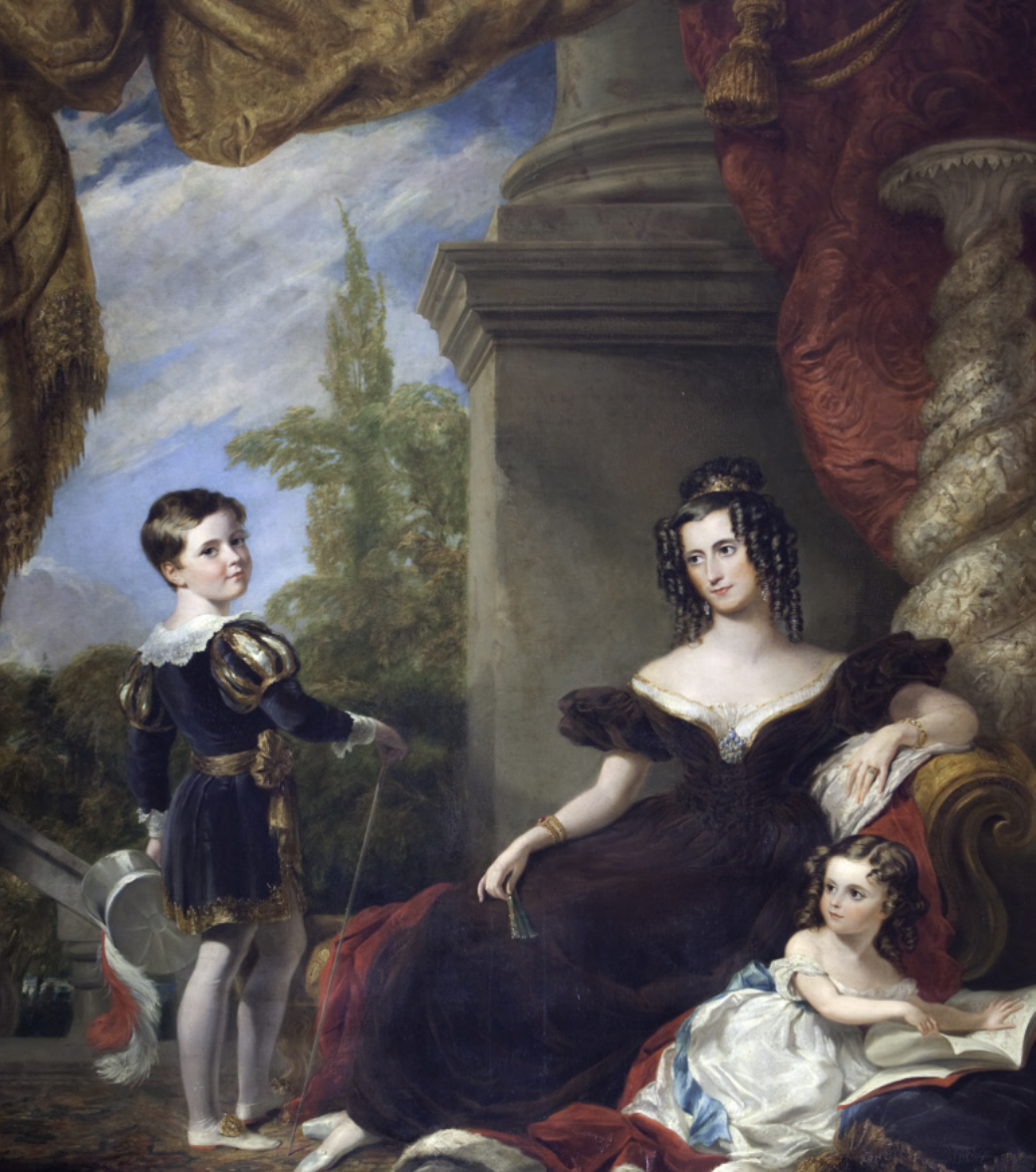
Louisa Philips, Countess of Lichfield (c.1800-1879) with two of her Children, Thomas George Anson and Lady Harriet Frances Maria Anson, painted in 1832

Lord John Russell, 1832

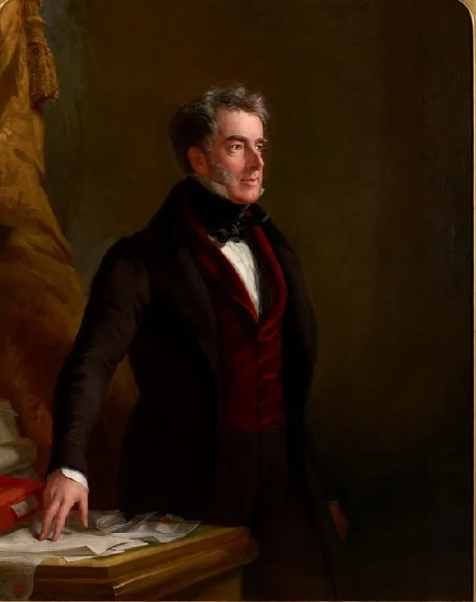
Lord Melbourne, 1838

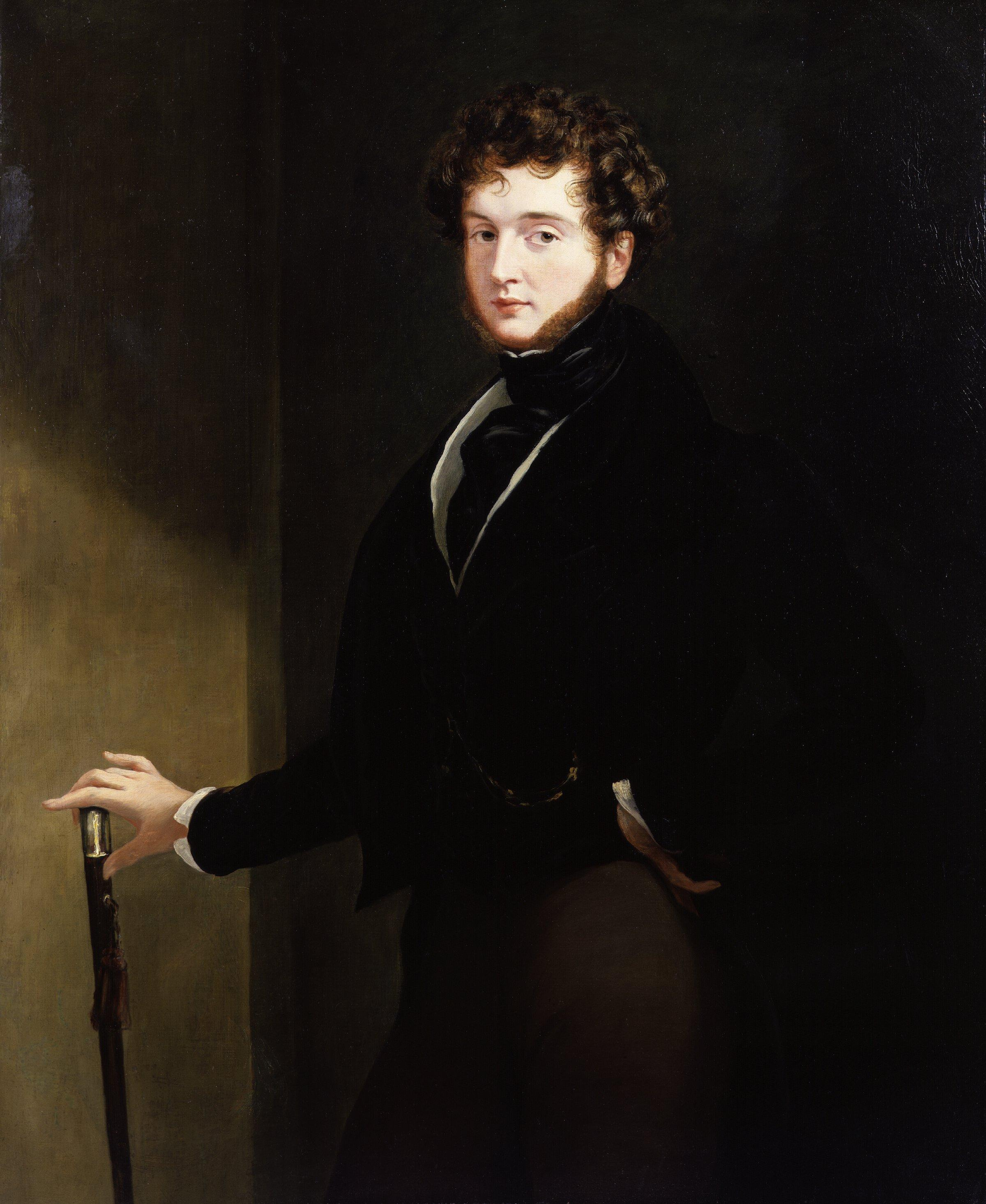
Alfred Count D'Orsay, 1839

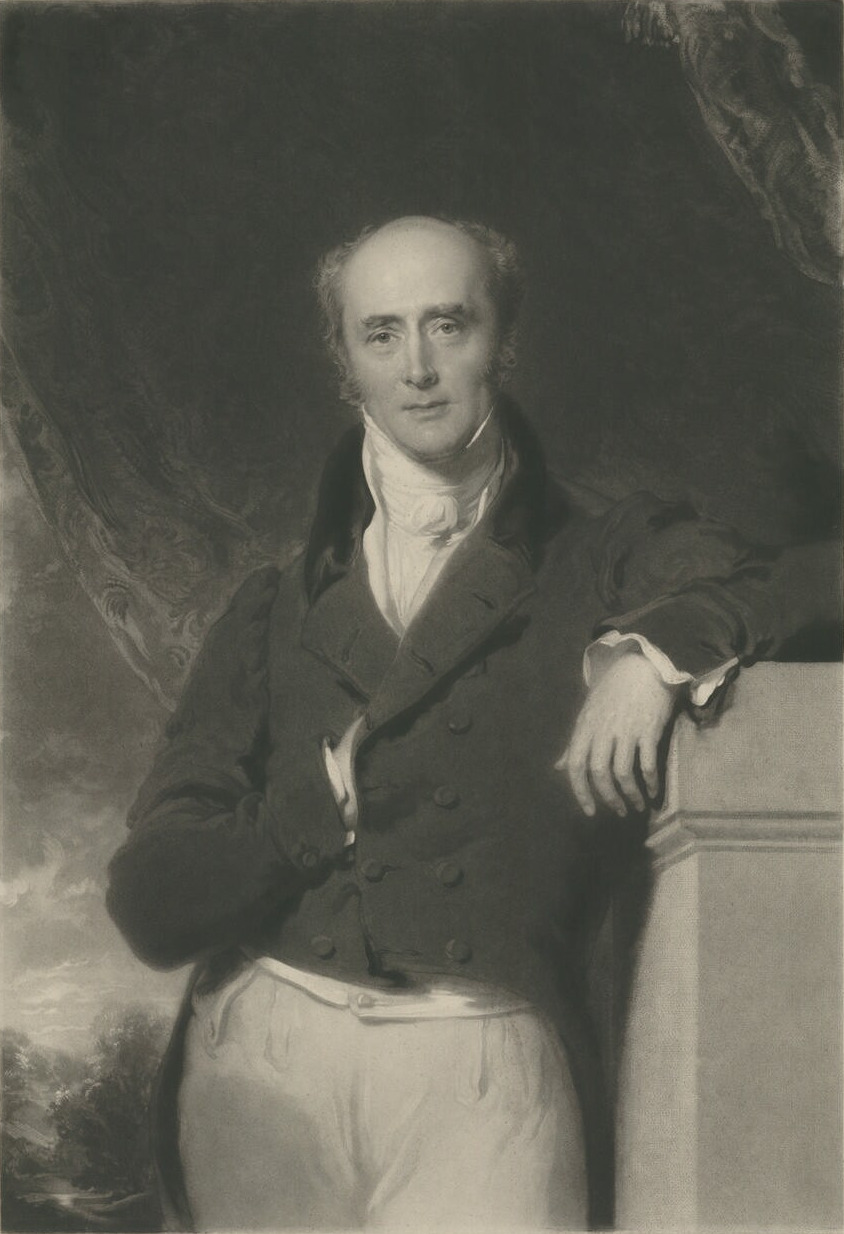
Charles Grey, 2nd Earl Grey Prime Minister 1830–1834

Lord Melbourne Prime Minister 1834, 1835–1841

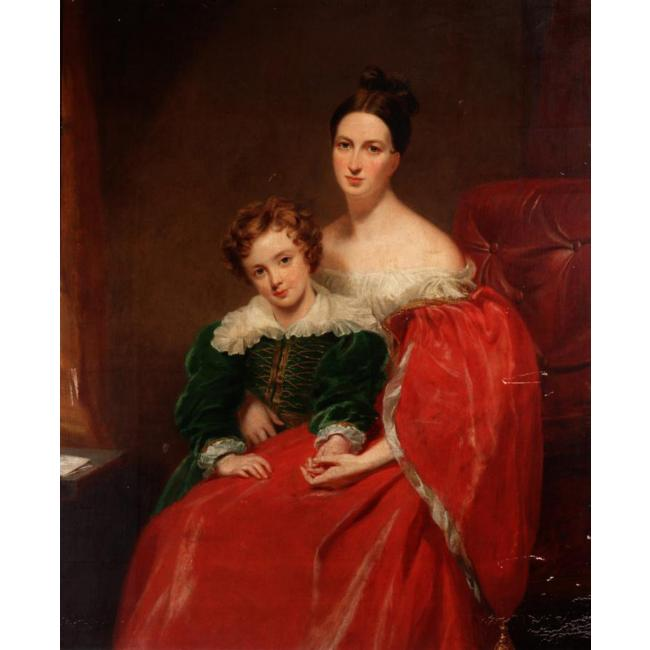
Robert Lawrence Pemberton of Bainbridge House with his mother

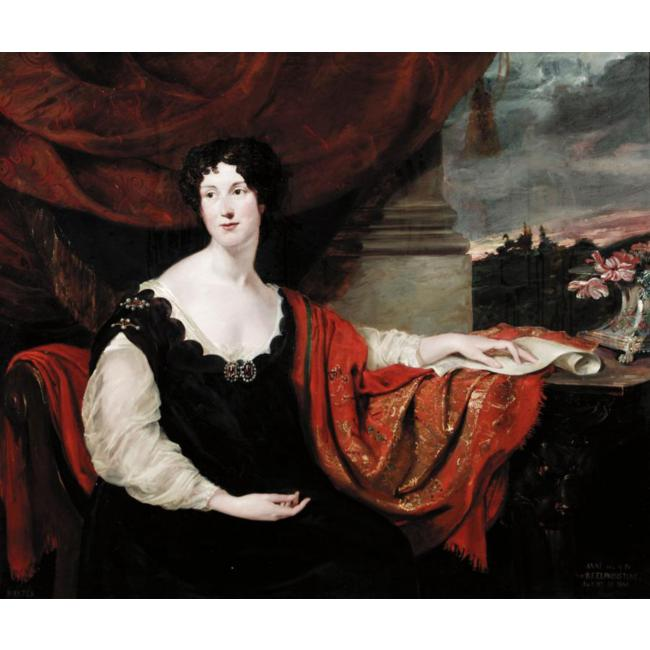
Anne Elphinstone 1835

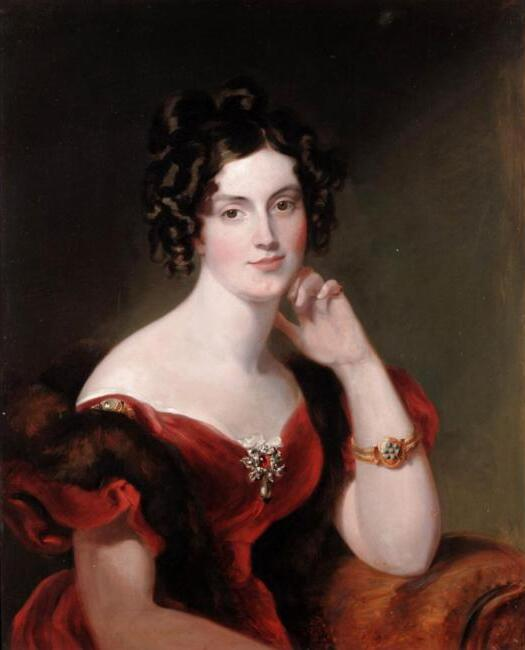
Lady Elizabeth Harcourt, eldest daughter of 2nd Earl of Lucan and wife of George Harcourt

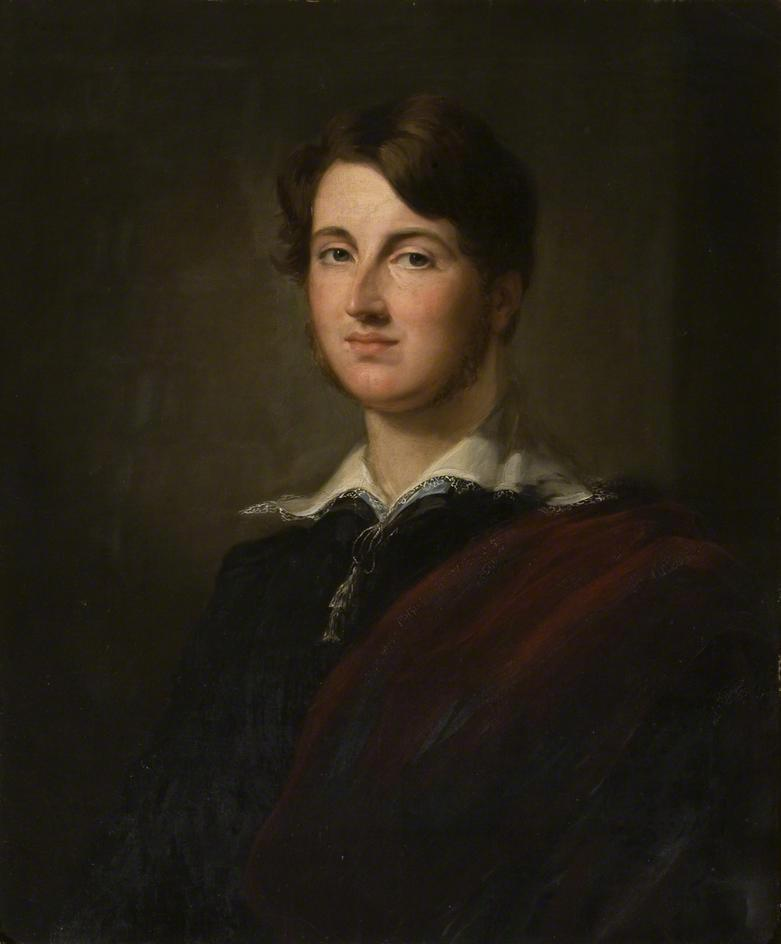
John Montagu, 7th Earl of Sandwich (1811–1884), 7th Earl of Sandwich

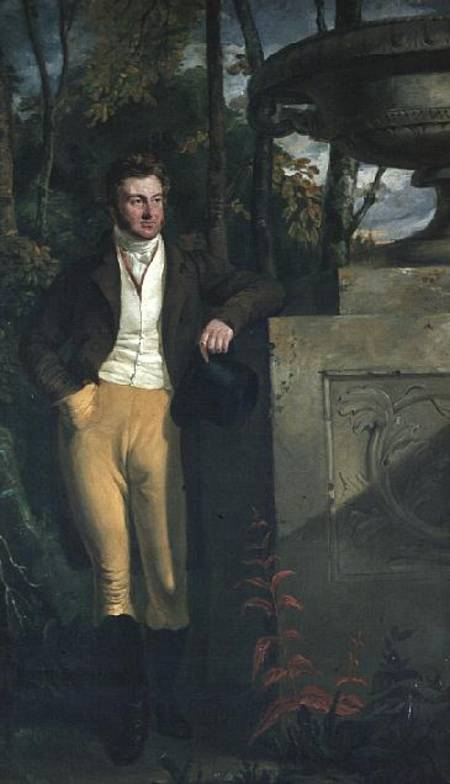
John Spencer, 3rd Earl Spencer (1782–1845)

William Craven, 2nd Earl of Craven

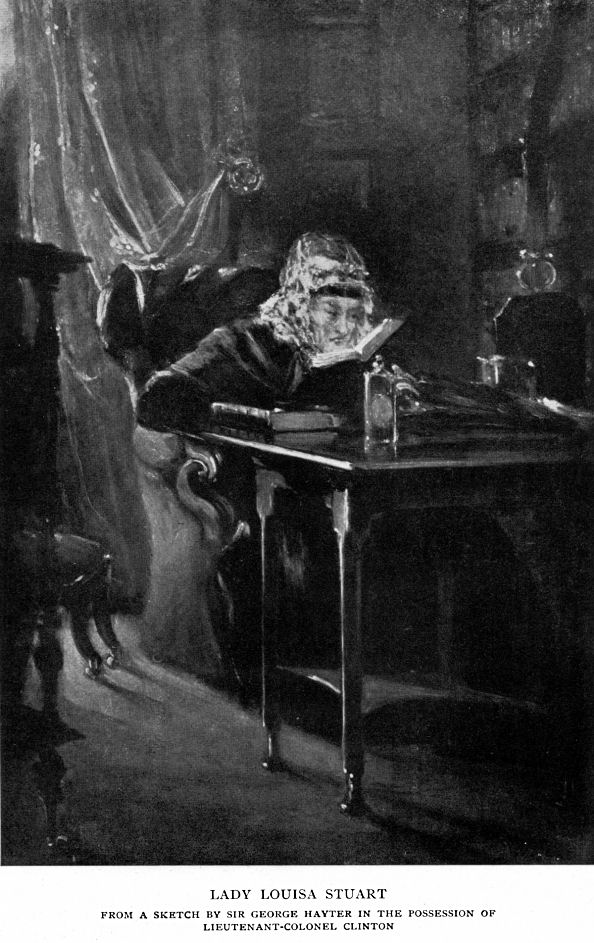
Lady Louisa Stuart at the age of ninety-three, sketch in oils

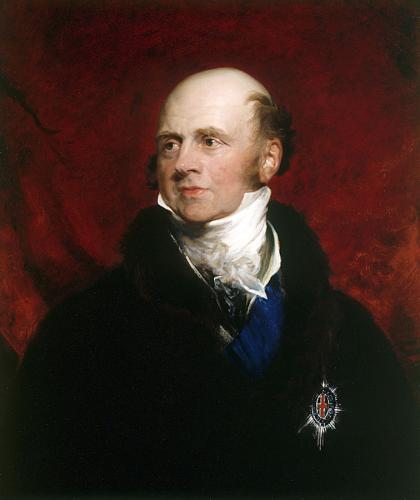
John Russell, 6th Duke of Bedford (1766–1839)

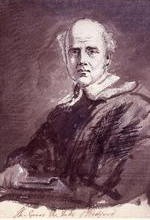
John Russell, 6th Duke of Bedford (1766–1839)

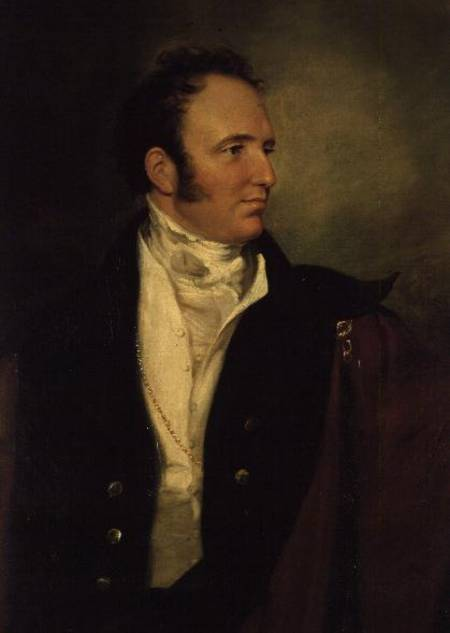
George Bridgeman, 2nd Earl of Bradford

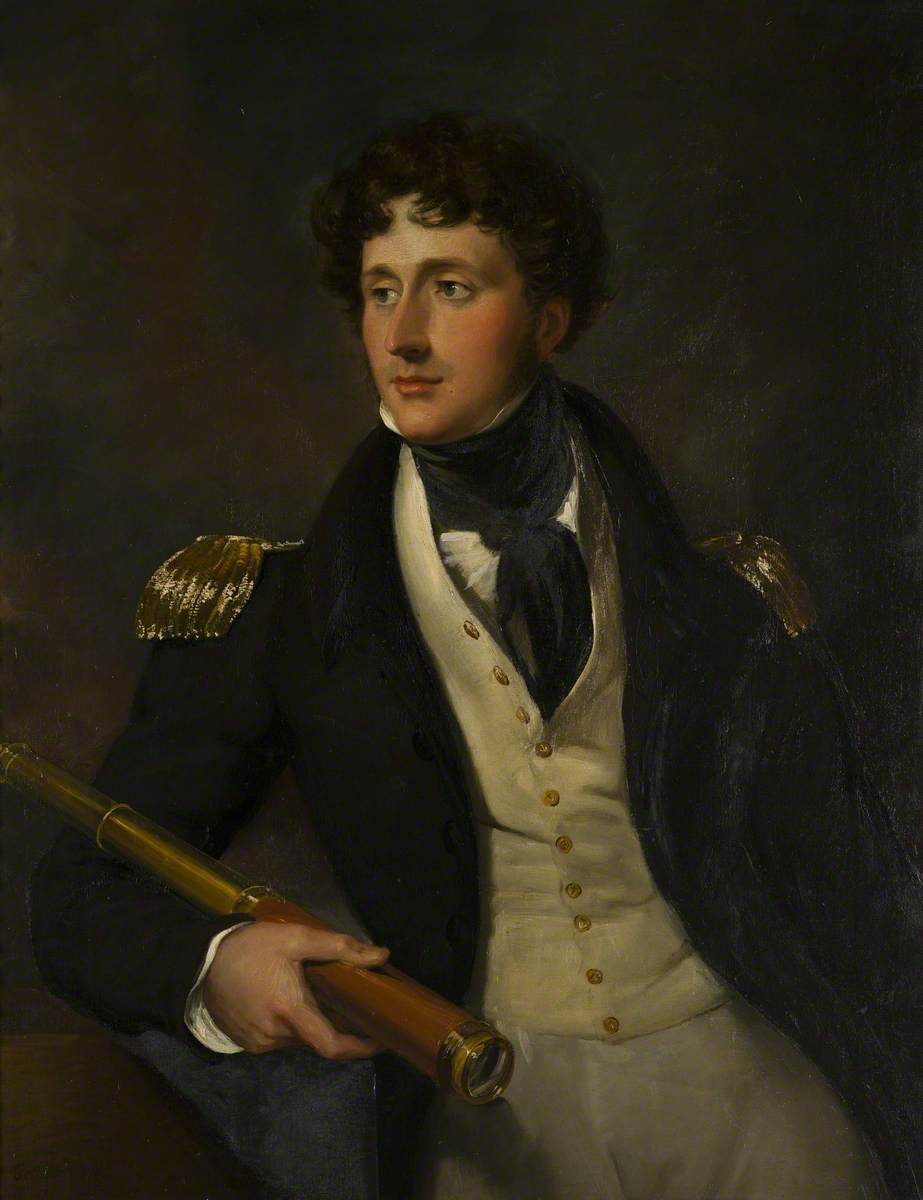
Vice Admiral Charles Bridgeman

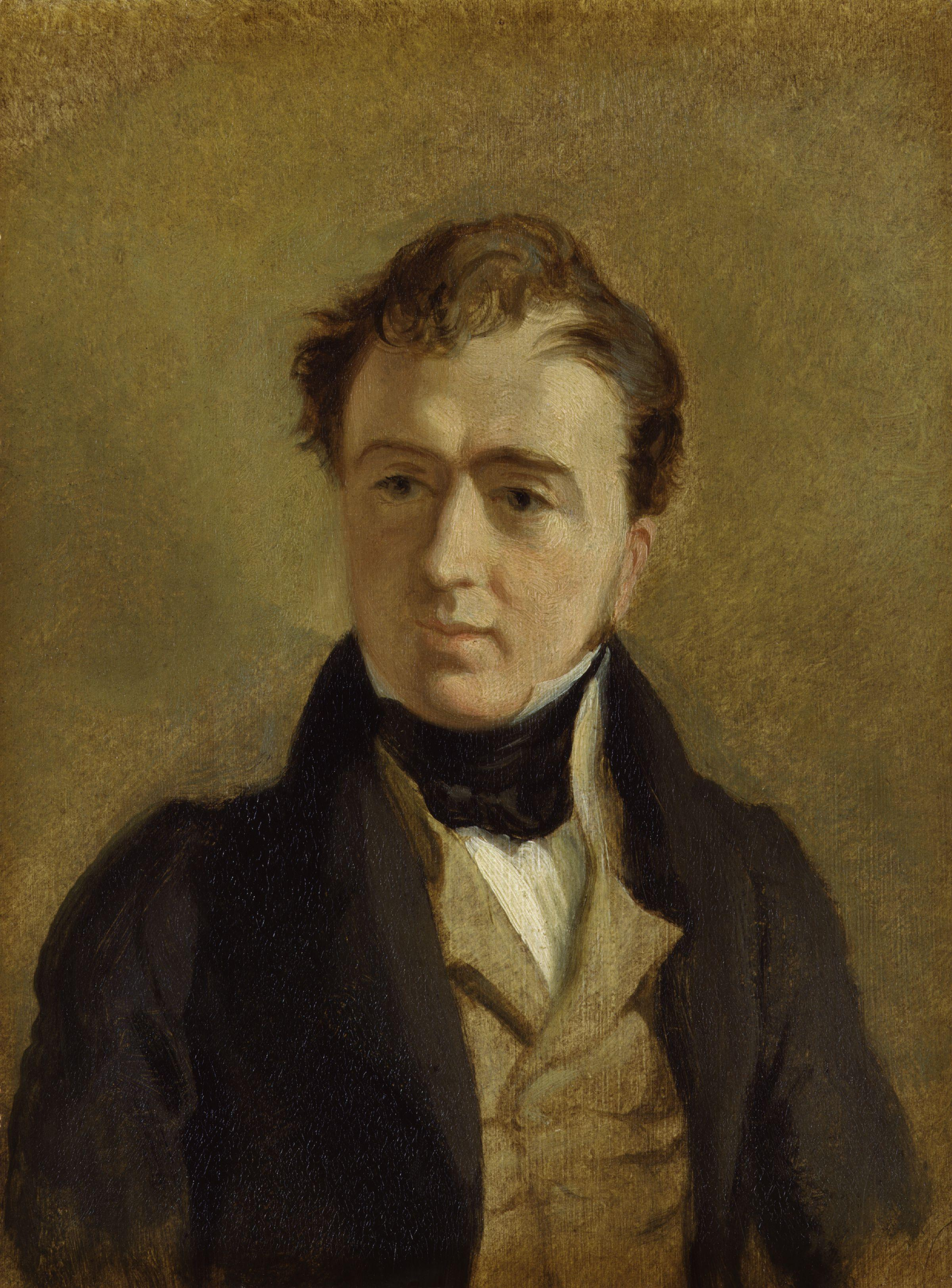
Francis Baring, 1st Baron Northbrook (1833) for House of Commons picture

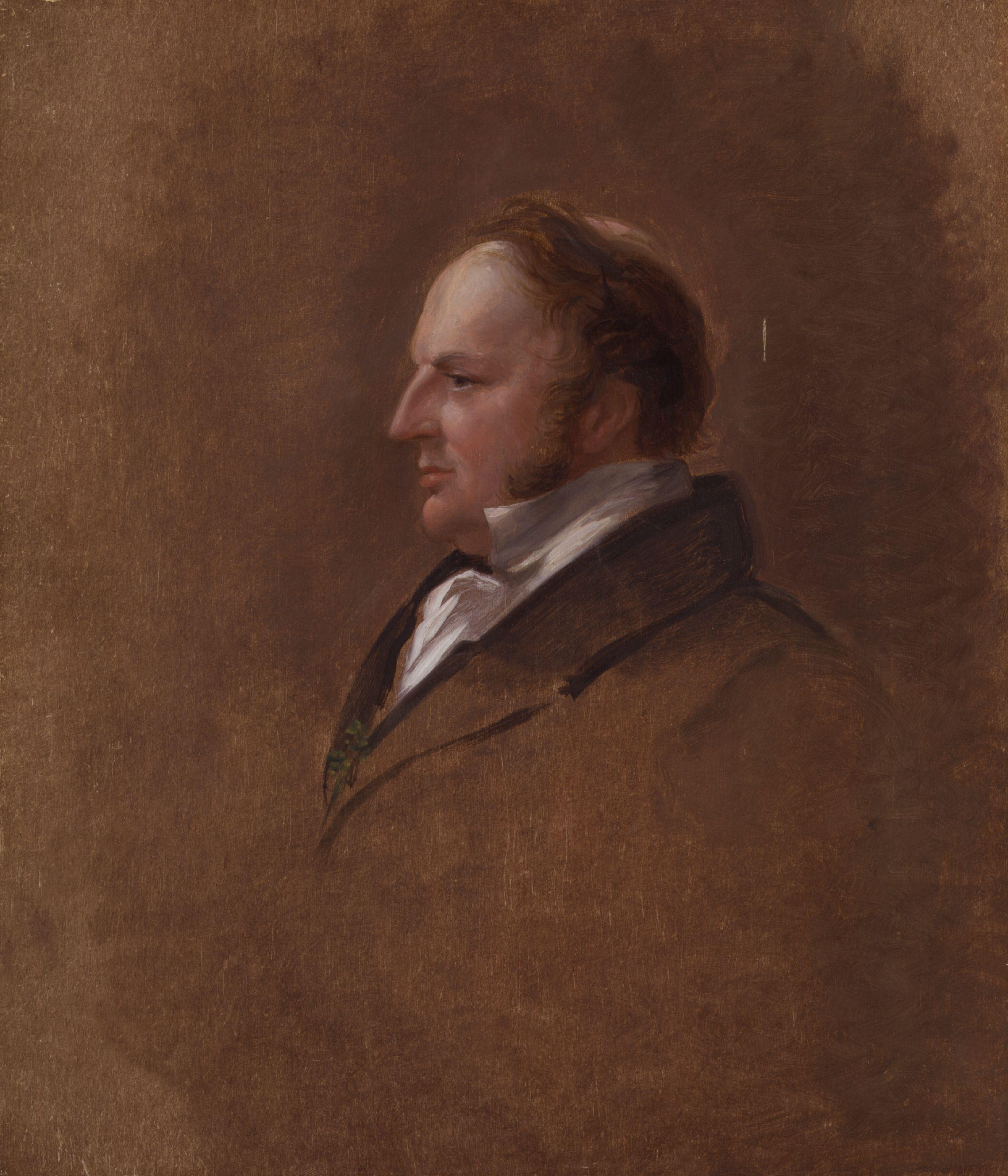
Sir Robert Inglis, 2nd Baronet

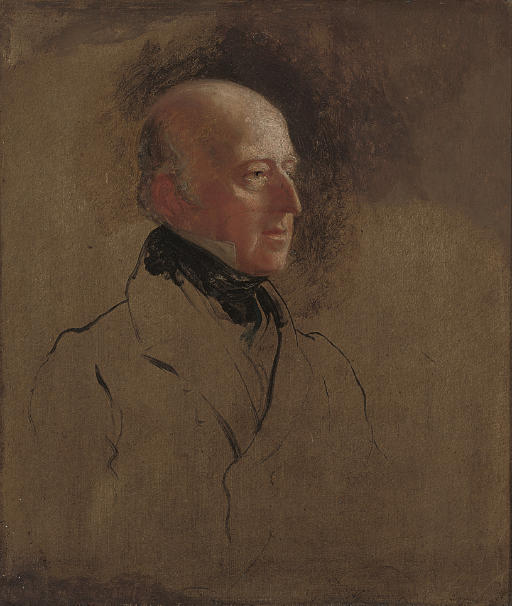
Admiral Sir Edward Codrington 1835

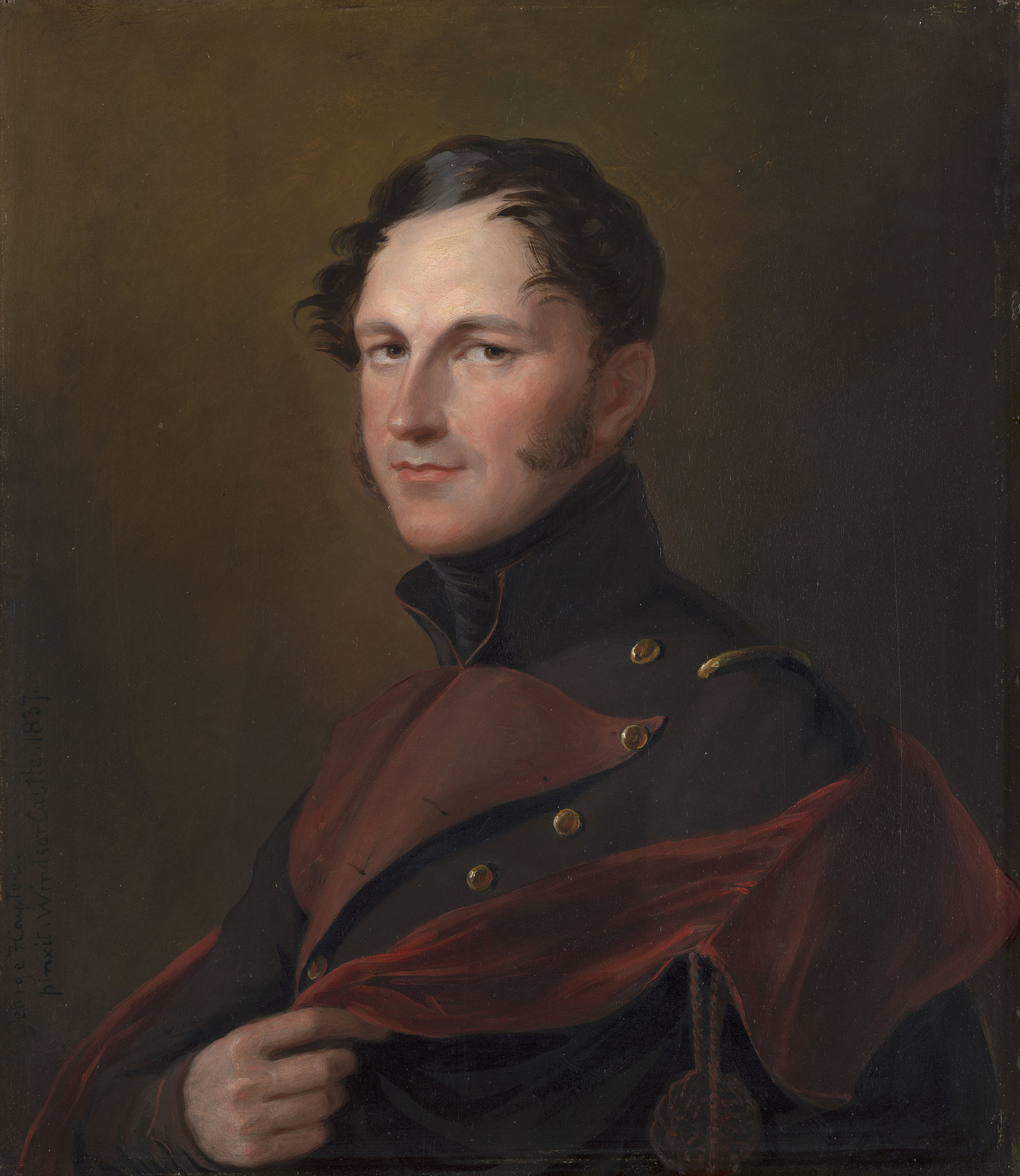
King Leopold I of Belgium, 1837

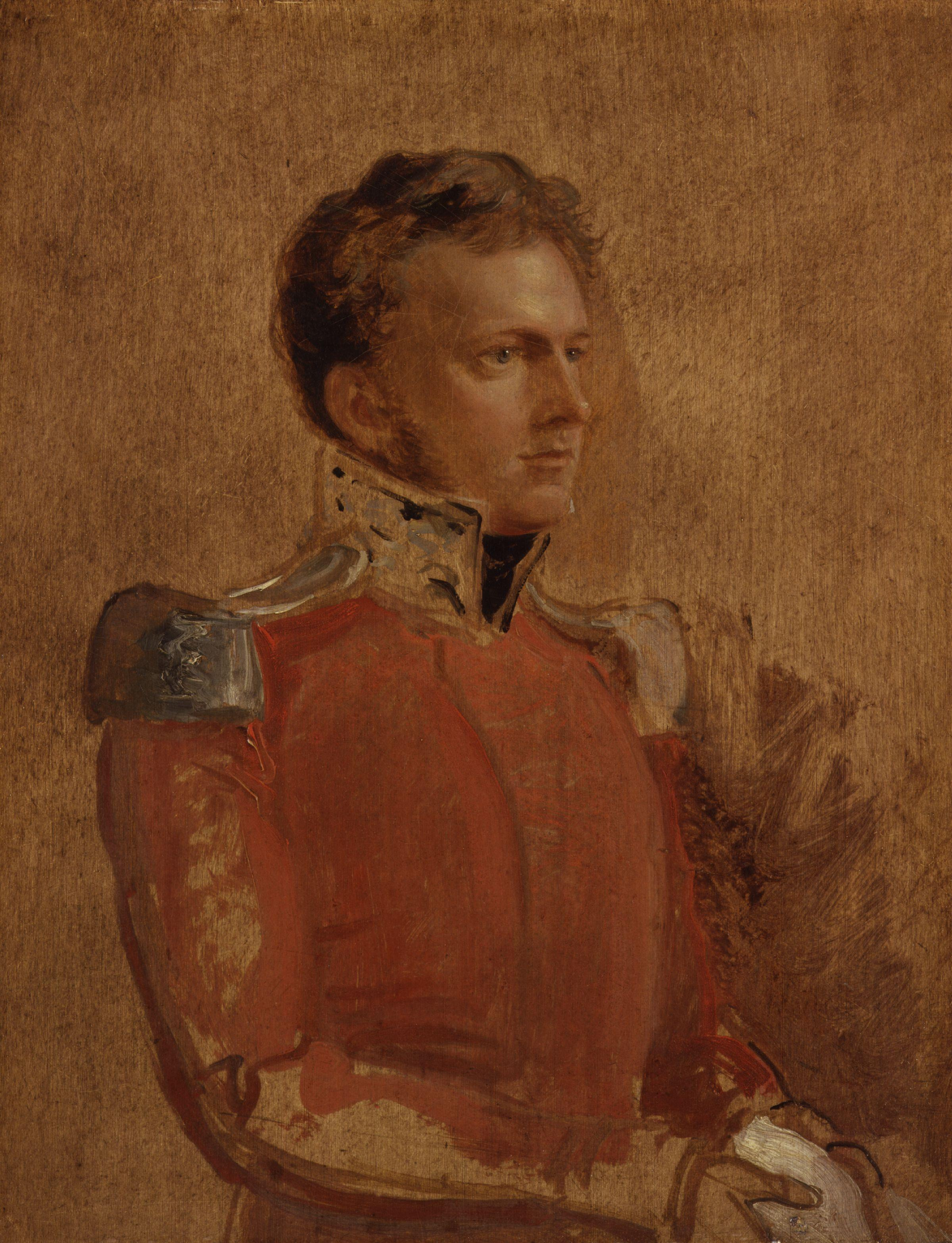
John Campbell, 2nd Marquess of Breadalbane, 1833

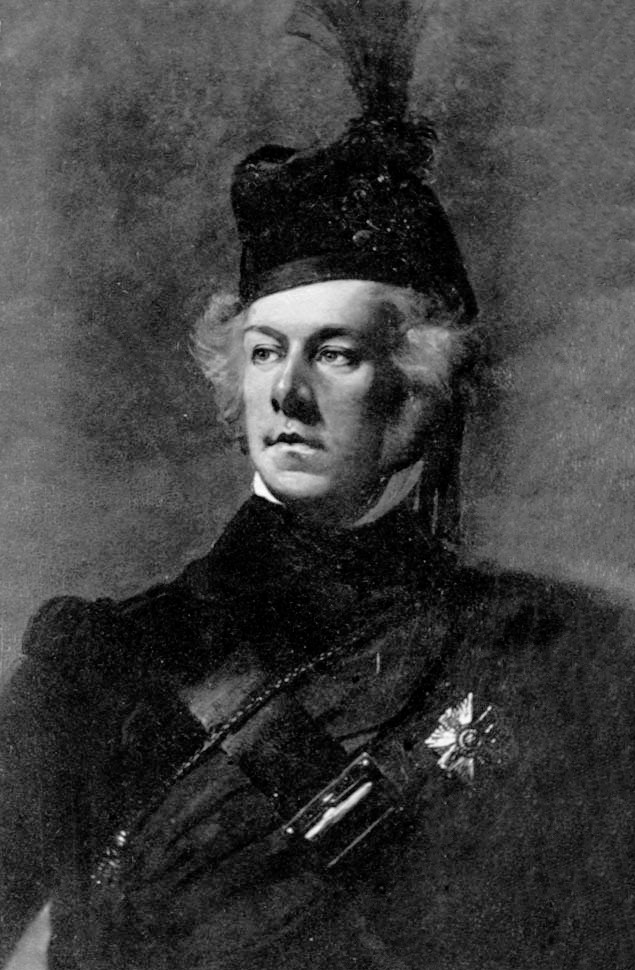
John Campbell, 2nd Marquess of Breadalbane, 1834

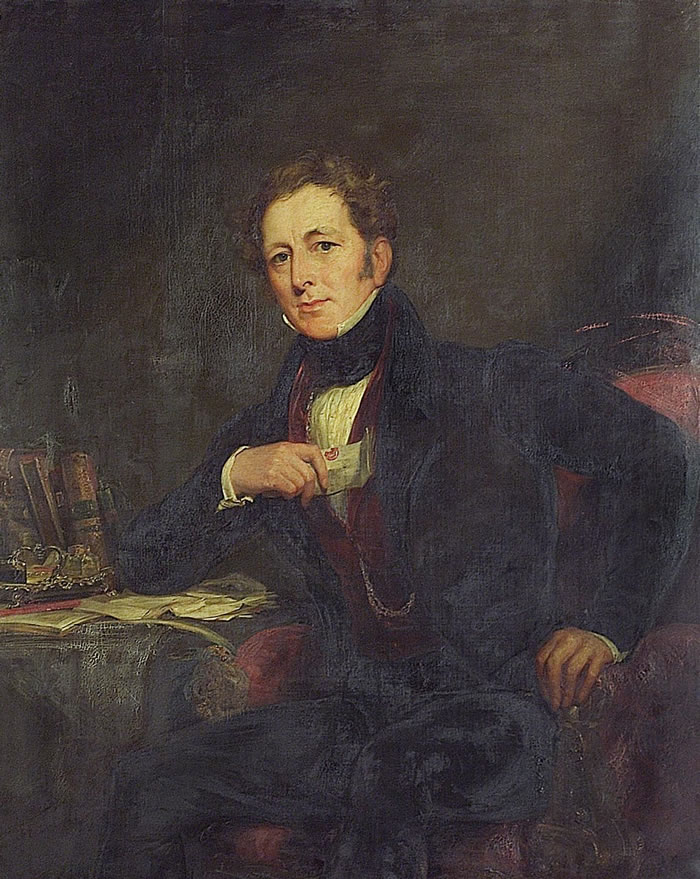
Thomas Brunton in 1832 (inventor of studded-link, marine chain cable), friend of the artist

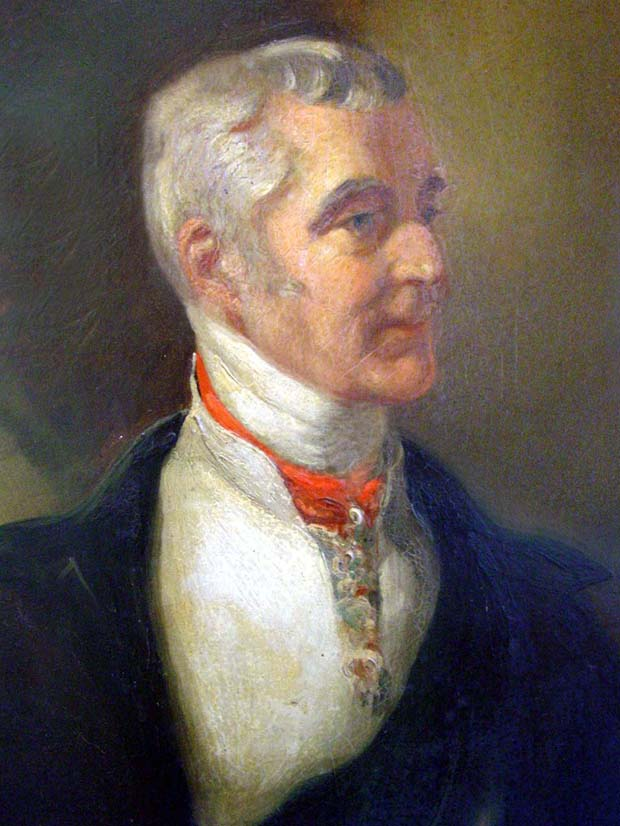
The Duke of Wellington (1839), for the House of Commons picture

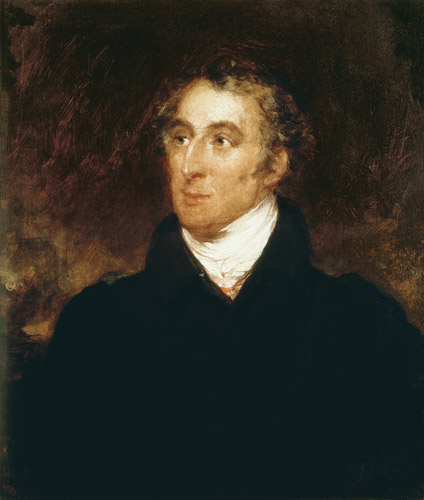
The Duke of Wellington

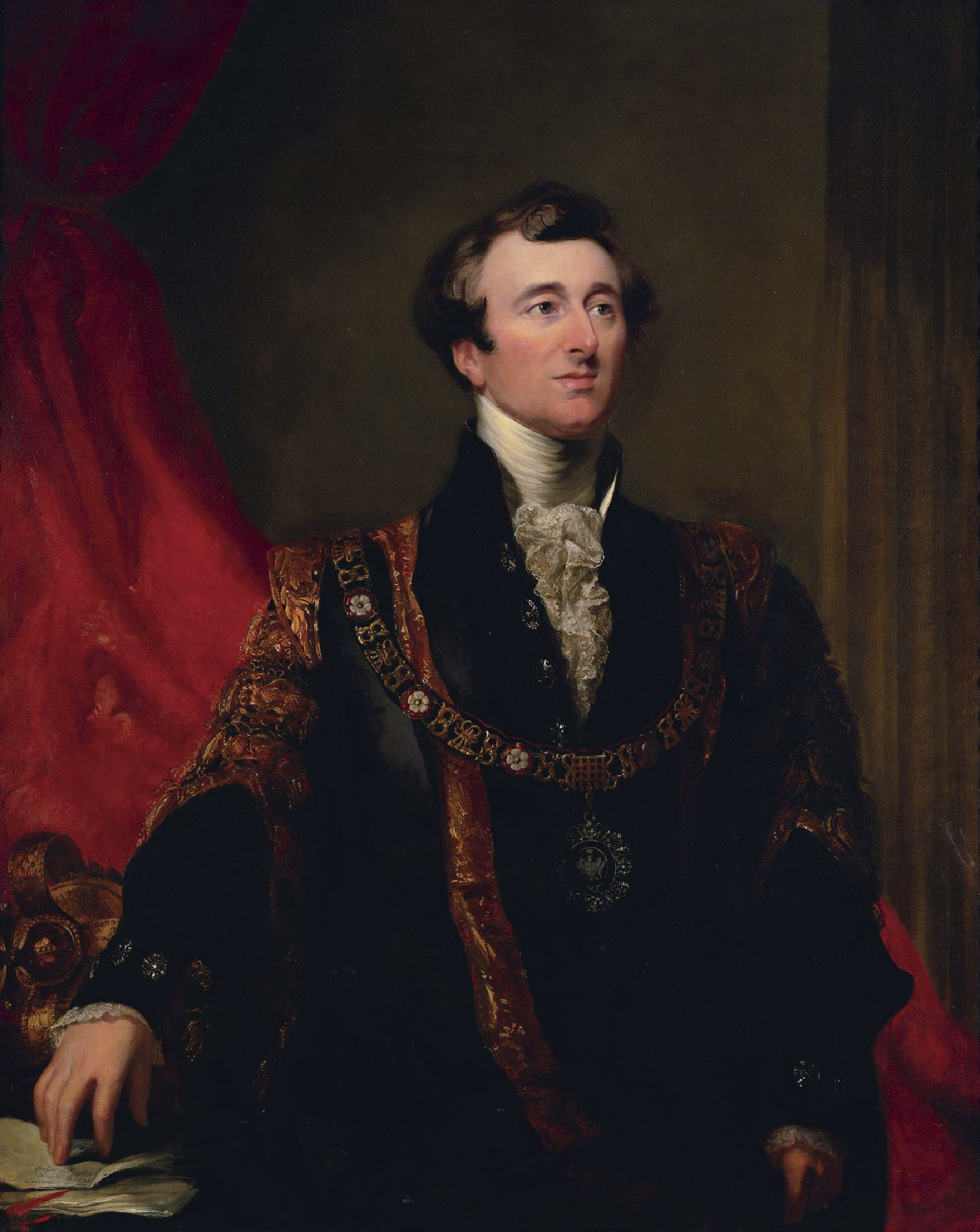
Rt Hon John Johnson, Lord Mayor of London 1845

Sir James Robertson-Bruce 2nd Bt painted in 1820

Mrs Ellen Robertson-Bruce painted in 1820

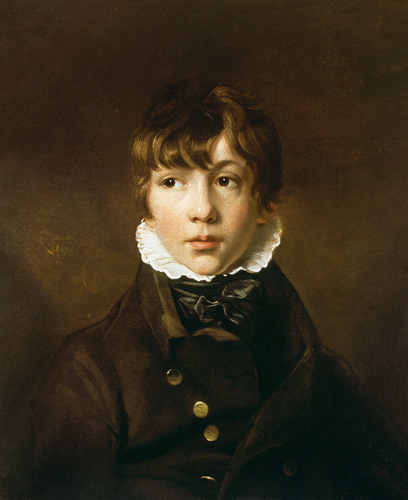
Portrait of a boy

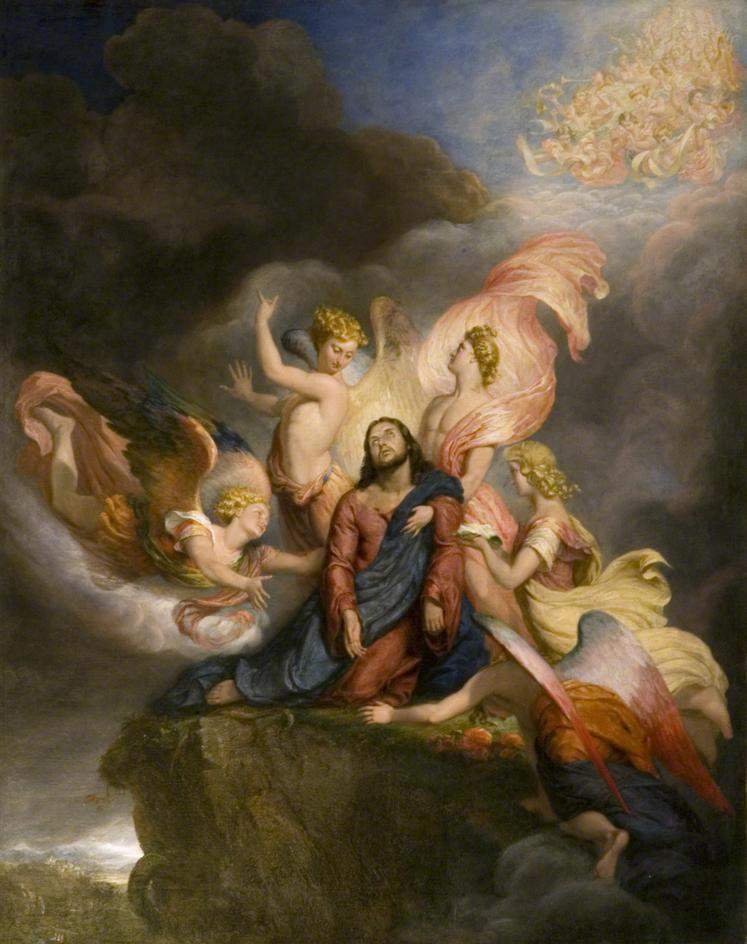
The Angels Ministering to Christ, 1849

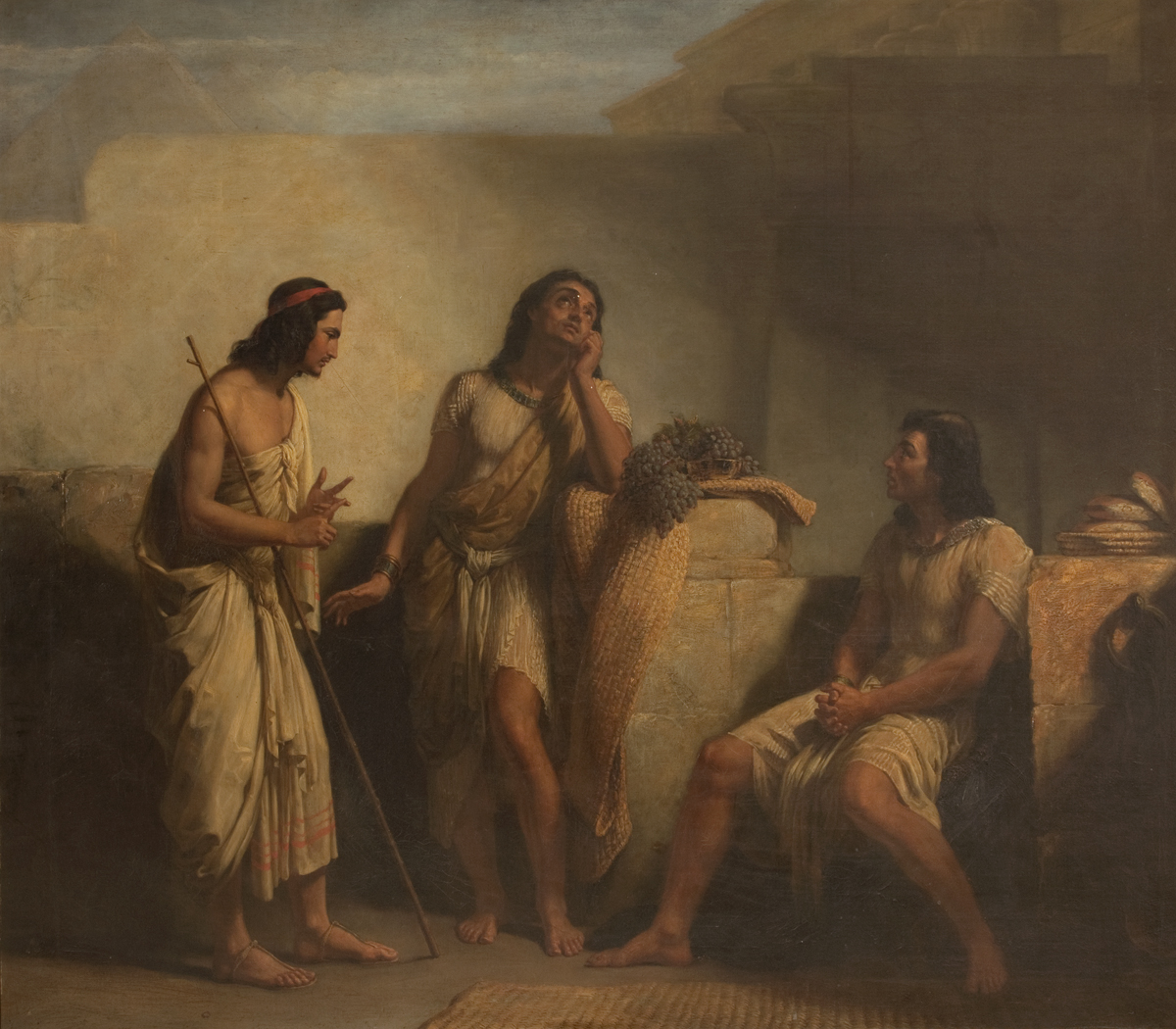
Joseph Interpreting the Dream of the Chief Baker, 1854

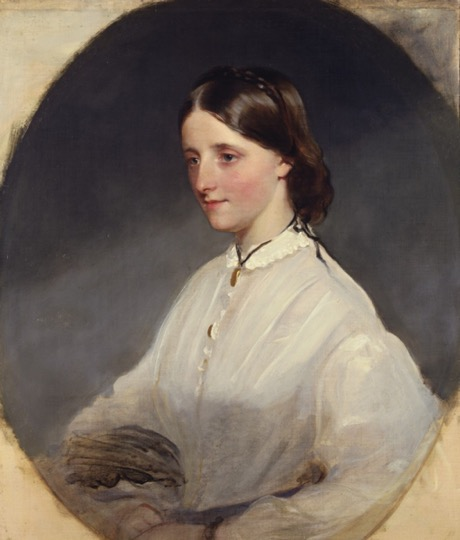
Amy Emily Sarah Fitzroy, 1858

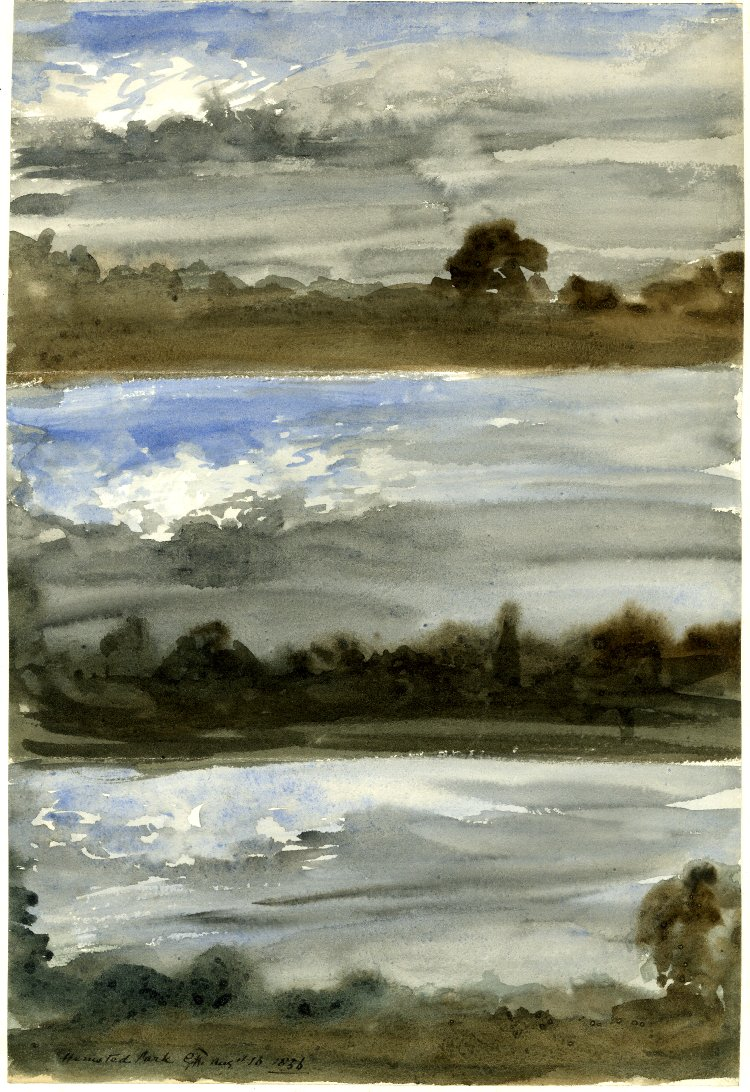
Hemsted Park, three studies with trees and storm clouds, 1856

== See also ==
- List of British painters
- Henry Collen

Court offices
Preceded by Sir David Wilkie	Principal Painter in Ordinary to the Queen; 1841–1871	Succeeded by James Sant
