= 1838 in art =

Events from the year 1838 in art.

== Events ==
- March 1 – The Salon of 1838 opens at the Louvre in Paris
- April 8 – The British National Gallery first opens to the public in the building purpose-designed for it by William Wilkins in Trafalgar Square, London.
- May 7 – The Royal Academy Exhibition of 1838 opens at the National Gallery in London
- August 31 – Scottish-born scene painter David Roberts sets sail for Egypt, with the encouragement of J. M. W. Turner, to produce a series of drawings of the region for use as the basis for paintings and chromolithographs.

== Works ==
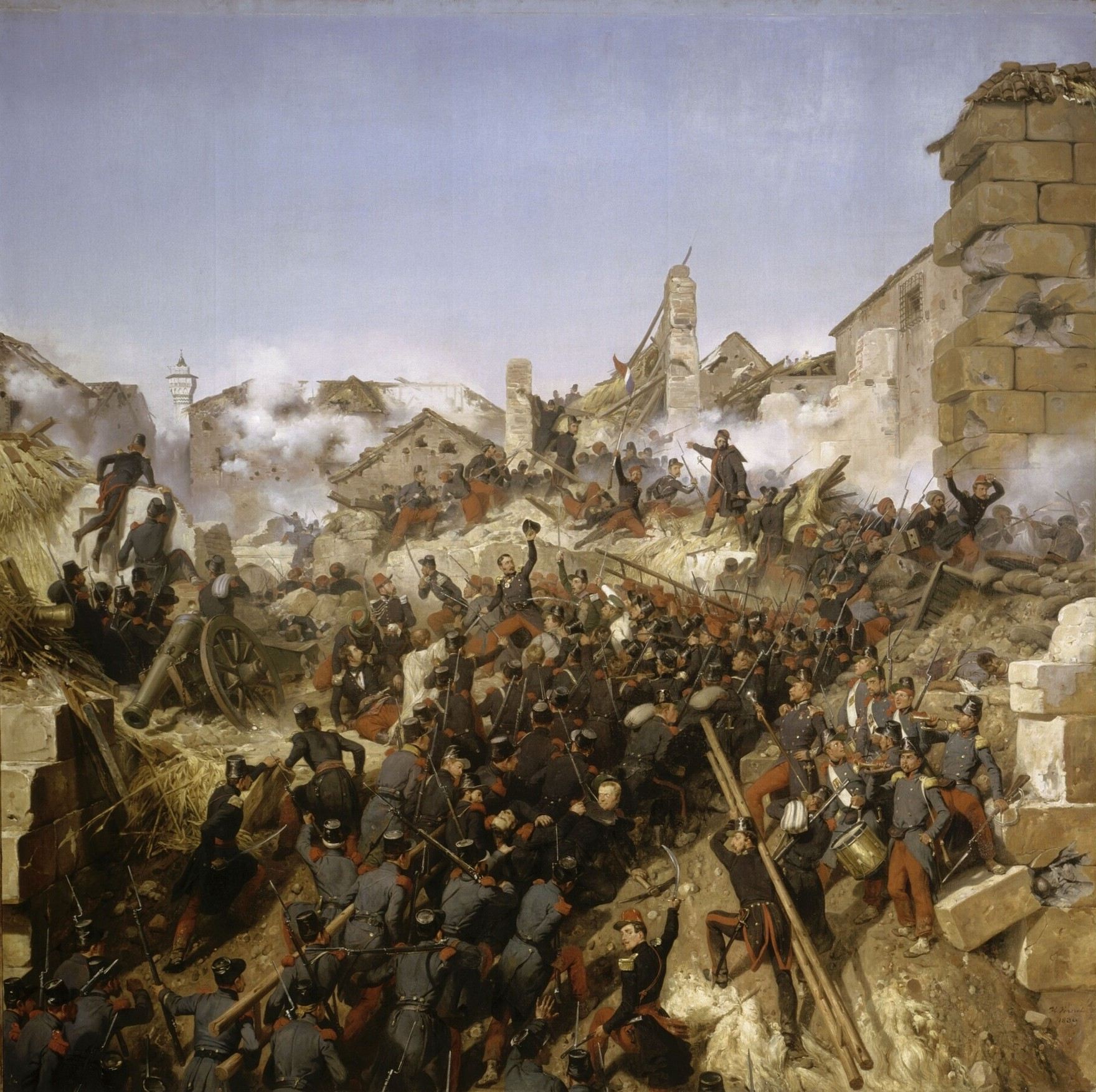
The Siege of Constantine by Horace Vernet.

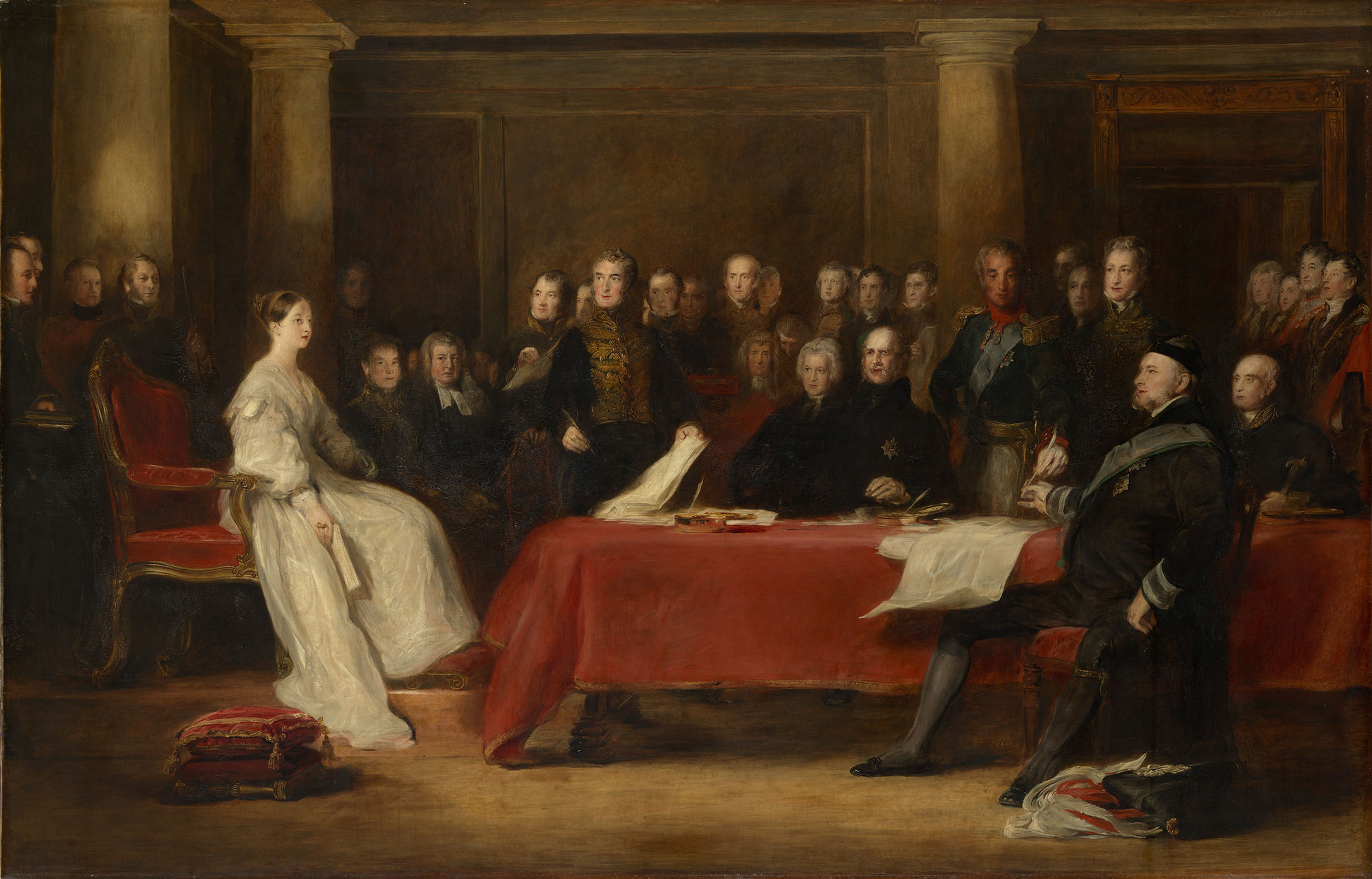
The First Council of Queen Victoria by David Wilkie.

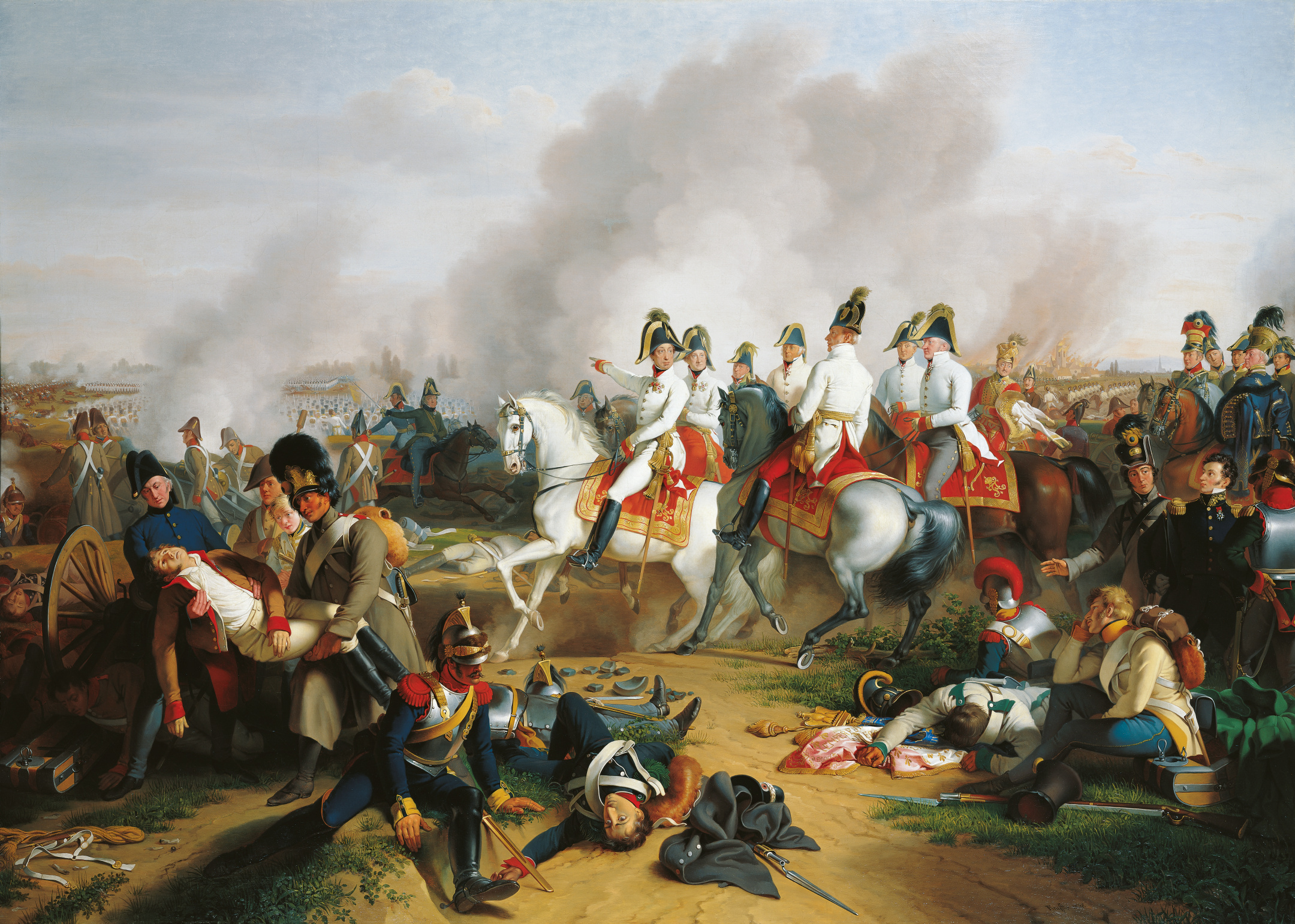
The Battle of Aspern-Essling by Johann Peter Krafft

- Théodore Chassériau – Venus Anadyomene
- Edward William Cooke – Mont Saint Michel, Normandy
- Joseph-Désiré Court – Portrait of Sylvain Charles Valée
- Asher B. Durand – Dance on the Battery in the Presence of Peter Stuyvesant
- Eugène Delacroix
  - Cleopatra and the Peasant
  - Convulsionists of Tangiers (completed)
  - Portrait of Frédéric Chopin and George Sand (unfinished; later separated)
  - The Death of Ophelia
- William Powell Frith – Self-Portrait
- Nicolas Gosse – The Congress of Erfurt
- Solomon Hart – An Early Reading of Shakespeare
- George Hayter – Queen Victoria Enthroned in the House of Lords
- Johann Peter Krafft – The Battle of Aspern-Essling
- John Linnell – Portrait of Sir Robert Peel
- Daniel Maclise – Merry Christmas in the Baron's Hall
- Louis Meijer – Self-portrait
- Giuseppe Molteni – The Confession
- David Roberts – Chapel of Ferdinand and Isabella, Granada
- Thomas Sully – Portrait of Queen Victoria
- Clarkson Stanfield – Sands near Boulogne
- J.M.W. Turner
  - Ancient Italy – Ovid Banished from Rome
  - Fishing Boats with Hucksters Bargaining for Fish
  - Phryne Going to the Public Baths as Venus
- Horace Vernet
  - The Siege of Constantine
  - Napoleon at the Tuileries
- David Wilkie
  - The Bride at her Toilet
  - Portrait of Daniel O'Connell
  - The First Council of Queen Victoria
- William Wyon – young profile head of Queen Victoria on coins of the pound sterling

== Births ==
- March 14 – Hermann Kern, painter (died 1912)
- March 28 – Jean-Paul Laurens, painter and sculptor (died 1921)
- May 15 – Nicolae Grigorescu, painter (died 1907)
- June 11 – Mariano Fortuny, painter (died 1874)
- June 24 – Jan Matejko, painter (died 1893)
- September 18 – Anton Mauve, painter (died 1888)
- November 18 – William Keith, painter (died 1911)
- November 28 – Alexander Opekushin, sculptor (died 1923)
- December 9 – Gerard Bilders, painter (died 1865)
- December 25 – Raffaello Sernesi, painter and medallist (died 1866)
- December 31 – Jules Dalou, sculptor (died 1902)

== Deaths ==
- January 5 – Maria Cosway, Italian-English painter, engraver, composer, musician, and society hostess (born 1760)
- January 8 – Josef Grassi, Austrian painter especially of portraits (born 1757)
- February 28 – Charles Thévenin, neoclassical French painter, known for heroic scenes (born 1764)
- March 2 – Benjamin Barker, landscape painter (born 1776)
- March 29 – Carlo Lasinio, Italian engraver (born 1759)
- May 10 – José Aparicio, Spanish painter of the Neoclassic period (born 1773)
- June 4 – Claude Ramey, sculptor (born 1754)
- August 5 – Anton Schimser, Polish sculptor of Austrian origin (born 1790)
- September 5 – Charles Percier, architect and designer (born 1764)
- November 9 – Friedrich Carl Gröger, north-German portrait painter and lithographer (born 1766)
- November 29 – Erik Gustaf Göthe, Swedish sculptor (born 1779)
- date unknown – John O'Keeffe, Irish portrait and figure painter (born 1797)
