= Portrait of Queen Victoria (Sully) =

Painting by Thomas Sully

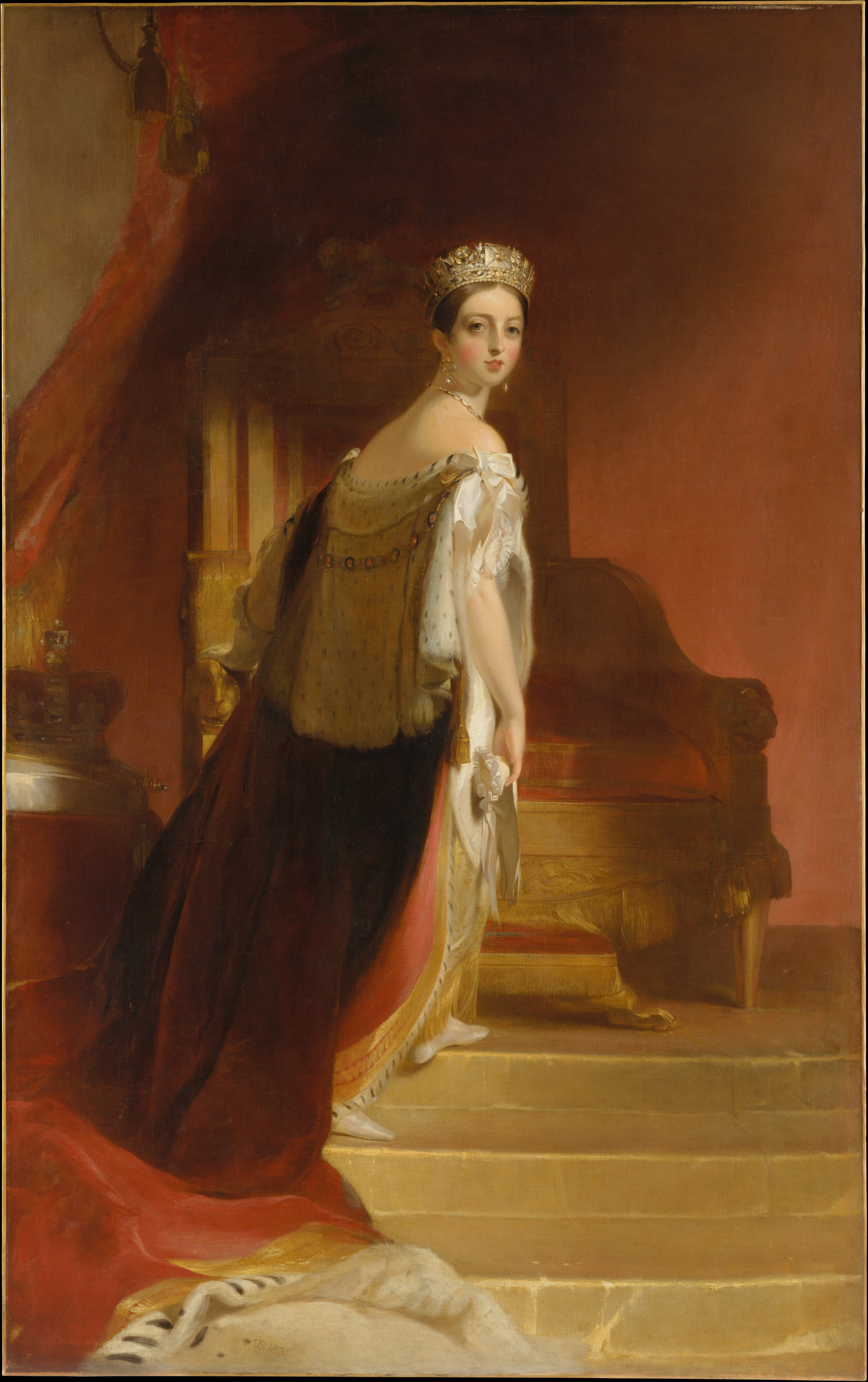
- Artist: Thomas Sully
- Year: 1838
- Type: Oil on canvas, portrait painting
- Dimensions: 238.8 cm × 147.3 cm (94.0 in × 58.0 in)
- Location: Metropolitan Museum of Art, New York

Portrait of Queen Victoria is an oil on canvas portrait painting by the English-American artist Thomas Sully, from 1838.

== History and description ==
It depicts Queen Victoria, who had come to the throne the previous year aged eighteen. The young queen is depicted in a rather unusual pose, since she is seen walking to the throne, while looking at the viewer. The depiction is possibly symbolic of the recent ascension to the throne of Victoria, here shown in a more literal sense. The portrait looks casual but at the same time regal, since it depicts all the usual references of portraits of royalty. Her crown and scepter are seen, at the left, in a small table.

The work was commissioned by the Philadelphia-based Society of the Sons of Saint George, a benevolent society supporting British emigrants to the United States. Sully travelled to London for five sittings with the young queen. The work was highly praised and compared favourably with a contemporaneous portrait by George Hayter, which was thought to make the queen look too mature and regal.

The painting is now in the collection of the Metropolitan Museum of Art, in New York, having been acquired in 2021. Another head-and-shoulders version, produced in order that the engraver Charles Edward Wagstaff could produce a print of the image, is now in the collection of the Wallace Collection, in London.

== Bibliography ==
- Fabian, Monroe H. Mr. Sully, Portrait Painter: The Works of Thomas Sully. National Portrait Gallery, 1983.
- Plunkett, John. Queen Victoria: First Media Monarch. Oxford University Press, 2003.

== See also ==
- Queen Victoria Enthroned in the House of Lords, an 1838 portrait painting by George Hayter
