= Portrait of Queen Victoria (Wilkie) =

Painting by David Wilkie

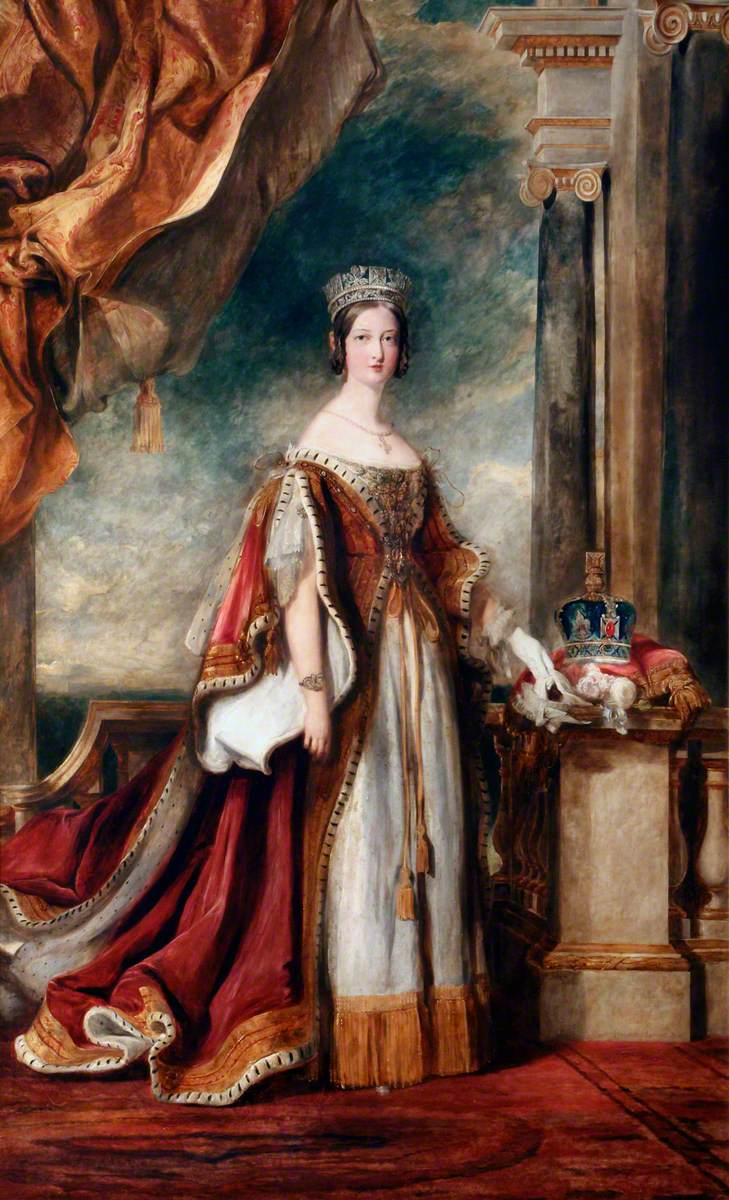
- Artist: David Wilkie
- Year: 1840
- Type: Oil on canvas, portrait painting
- Dimensions: 271.5 cm × 190.5 cm (106.9 in × 75.0 in)
- Location: Lady Lever Art Gallery, Merseyside

Portrait of Queen Victoria is an 1840 portrait painting by the Scottish artist David Wilkie. It depicts the reigning British monarch Queen Victoria around the age of twenty one. It depicts the young sovereign in her robes or state beside the crown. Known for his genre paintings, Wilkie been Principal Painter in Ordinary under William IV and was reapointed when Victoria succeeded to the throne in 1837.

The work was displayed at the Royal Academy Exhibition of 1840 at the National Gallery in London where it met with widespread criticism. The Prime Minister Lord Melbourne wrote that Wilkie "never could paint portraits and never will". Queen Victoria particularly disliked it. The hostile reception to the painting upset Wilkie. That autumn he embarked on a tour of the Middle East, but died on his return voyage near Gibraltar in June 1841. After his death Victoria preferred artists such as George Hayter, Francis Grant and Winterhalter to portray her.

As late as 1899 Victoria intervened to stop it being acquired by the National Portrait Gallery. Having at one point hung in the British Embassy in Paris it is today in the Lady Lever Art Gallery in Liverpool, having been acquired in 1906.

== See also ==
- The First Council of Queen Victoria, an 1839 painting by Wilkie showing Queen Victoria's accession to the throne
- Portrait of Queen Victoria, an 1842 painting by the Irish President of the Royal Academy Martin Archer Shee

== Bibliography ==
- Herrmann, Luke. Nineteenth Century British Painting. Charles de la Mare, 2000.
- Kidson, Alex. Earlier British Paintings in the Lady Lever Art Gallery. 1999.
- Tromans, Nicholas. David Wilkie: The People's Painter. Edinburgh University Press, 2007.
