= Merry Christmas in the Baron's Hall =

Painting by Daniel Maclise

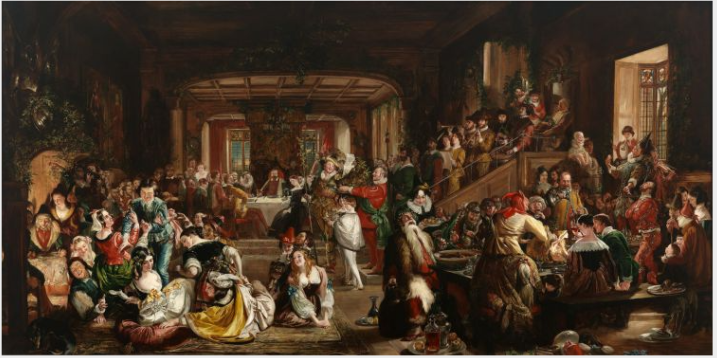
- Artist: Daniel Maclise
- Year: 1838
- Type: Oil on canvas, genre painting
- Dimensions: 183 cm × 366 cm (72 in × 144 in)
- Location: National Gallery of Ireland, Dublin

Merry Christmas in the Baron's Hall is an 1838 historical genre painting by the Irish artist Daniel Maclise. It depicts a scene in the great hall of an English country estate in Elizabethan or Jacobean England where the tenants have been invited by the baron to celebrate Christmas. It is loosely inspired by the poem Marmion by Sir Walter Scott.

The large painting features more than a hundred figures and depicts traditional festivities such as feasting on boar's head and music and games overseen by the Lord of Misrule. It was Maclise's friend Charles Dickens who did much to popularise modern ideas of Christmas during the Victorian era. This picture features a nostalgic idealised look to the past common to the Romantic movement.

The painting was displayed at the Royal Academy Exhibition of 1838 in London. Today it is in the National Gallery of Ireland in Dublin.

== Bibliography ==
- Boos, Florence. History and Community: Essays in Victorian Medievalism. Routledge, 2016.
- Murray, Peter. Daniel Maclise, 1806-1870: Romancing the Past. University of Michigan, 2008. .
- Weston, Nancy. Daniel Maclise: Irish Artist in Victorian London. Four Courts Press, 2001.
- Wright, Christopher, Gordon, Catherine May & Smith, Mary Peskett. British and Irish Paintings in Public Collections: An Index of British and Irish Oil Paintings by Artists Born Before 1870 in Public and Institutional Collections in the United Kingdom and Ireland. Yale University Press, 2006.
