= Hermann Kern =

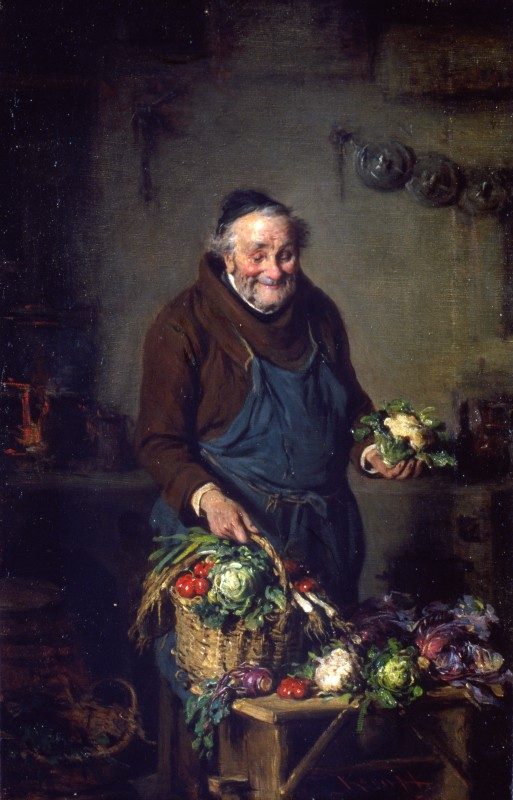
The Monk in the Kitchen, 1880 (Fondazione Cariplo)

Hermann Armin von Kern (14 March 1838 – 18 January 1912) was an academic painter, one of the most popular Austrian genre painters of his time and a court painter at the court of Franz Josef I in Vienna.

== Biography ==
He was born of a noble von Kern family in Liptóújvár, now Liptovský Hrádok, Slovakia, son of a famous doctor of medicine, Benjamin von Kern (1800–1868), who recognized his exceptional talent at an early age and paid for his education. Kern began his artistic training at the age of 16 in Levoča under Theo Böhm. He went to Prague in 1854, where he studied under J.B. Klemens, and then attended the Academy of Fine Arts Vienna, where he was instructed by C. Rahl. In 1867 he studied in Düsseldorf, and in 1870 he studied under Karl von Piloty at the Academy of Fine Arts in Munich, where he befriended Franz von Defregger.

He worked initially in Budapest as a portrait and genre painter. Later, he moved to Paris, and in 1877 he moved to Vienna, and lived there with his large family (his wife Paulina and 10 children) as a court painter for emperor Franz Joseph I until his death in 1912 in Maria Enzersdorf, Austria.

Kern specialised in portraits and genre scenes. The latter often depicted children at play, music making gypsies, tavern scenes, and single persons. In 1885 he painted the ceiling decoration of the Szeged Theatre.

Being a very good pianist he often made music with his friend, the composer Franz Liszt. Three of his 10 children, and many of his descendants became professional musicians and professional painters.

== Works (selection) ==
- Die Politiker von Laab, 1881
- Deckengemälde, Theater Szegedin, 1885
- Hochwürden zu Gast, 1896
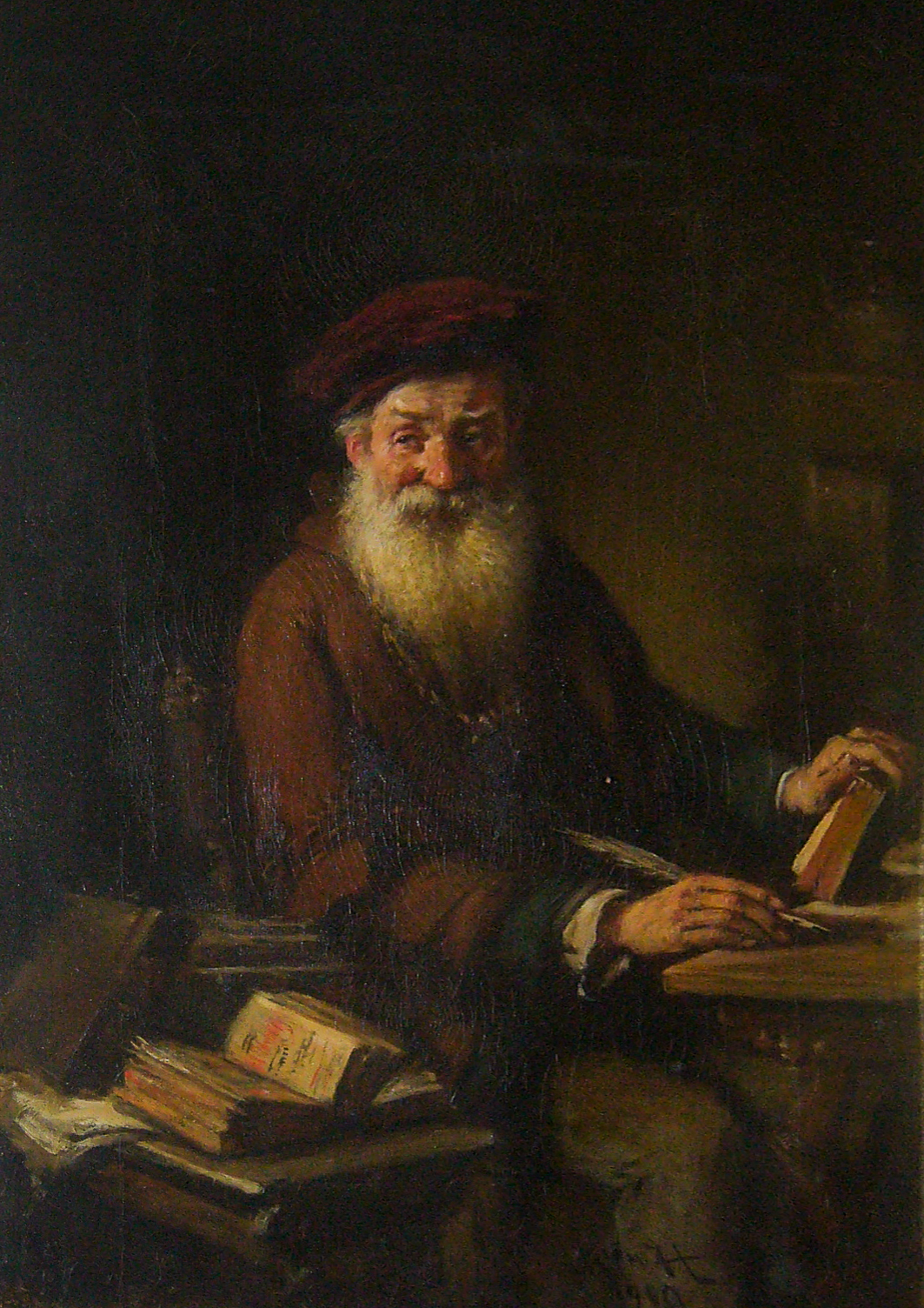
Hermann Armin Kern Selfportrait

== Other projects ==
Media related to Hermann Kern at Wikimedia Commons
