= Sands near Boulogne =

1838 painting by Clarkson Frederick Stanfield

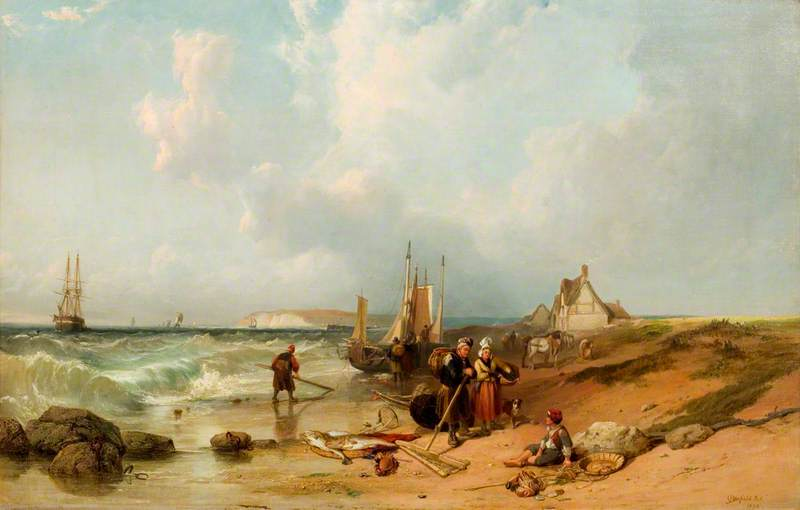
- Artist: Clarkson Stanfield
- Year: 1838
- Medium: Oil on canvas, landscape painting
- Dimensions: 71.1 cm × 110.5 cm (28.0 in × 43.5 in)
- Location: Victoria and Albert Museum, London

Sands near Boulogne is an 1838 landscape painting by the British artist Clarkson Stanfield. It features a view of the sandy beaches near Boulogne in Northern France. Such scenes of a stretch of French coastline featured in the works of Richard Parkes Bonington, who had been active the previous decade.

Stanfield was a former sailor noted for his often atmospheric Romantic seascapes. The painting was displayed at the Royal Academy Exhibition of 1838 at the National Gallery in London. It was acquired by the art collector John Sheepshanks who donated it as part of the Sheepshanks Gift of 1857 to the new Victoria and Albert Museum in South Kensington. In 1870 it as one of twenty paintings from the Sheepshanks Gift highlighted by Richard Redgrave.

== Bibliography ==
- Parkinson, Ronald. Catalogue of British Oil Paintings 1820-1860. Victoria and Albert Museum, 1990.
- Redgrave, Richard. The Sheepshanks Gallery. Bell and Daldy, 1870.
- Roe, Sonia. Oil Paintings in Public Ownership in the Victoria and Albert Museum. Public Catalogue Foundation, 2008.
- Van der Merwe, Pieter & Took, Roger. The Spectacular career of Clarkson Stanfield. Tyne and Wear County Council Museums, 1979.
