= Phryne Going to the Public Baths as Venus =

Painting by J. M. W. Turner

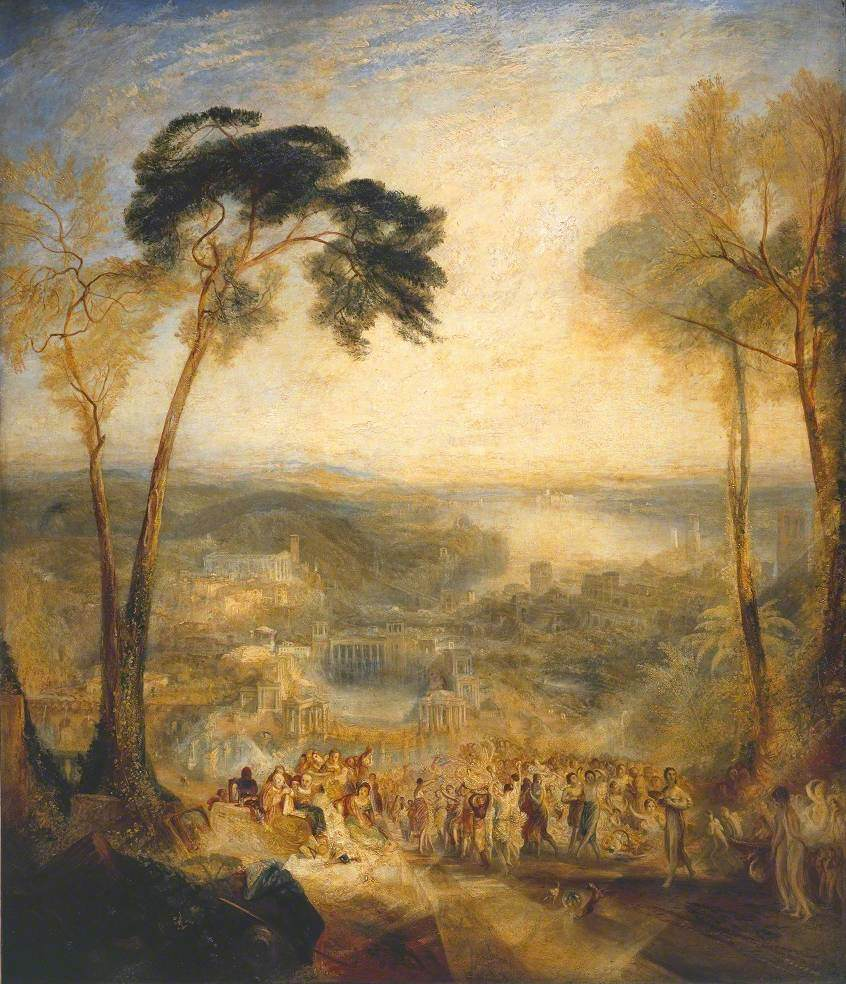
- Artist: J. M. W. Turner
- Year: 1838
- Type: Oil on canvas, history painting
- Dimensions: 193 cm × 165.1 cm (76 in × 65.0 in)
- Location: Tate Britain, London

Phryne Going to the Public Baths as Venus, Demosthenes Taunted by Aeschines is an 1838 history painting by the British artist J. M. W. Turner. It depicts a scene in Ancient Athens in the 4th century BC, combining two different legendary stories. The celebrated courtesan Phryne is going to the public baths in a public parade dressed as Venus. Meanwhile, the celebrated statesman and orators Demosthenes and Aeschines are engaged in a public dispute.

The painting was displayed at the Royal Academy Exhibition of 1838 held at the National Gallery in London. It was part of the Turner Bequest to the nation in 1856 and is now in the collection of the Tate Britain in Pimlico.

== See also ==
- List of paintings by J. M. W. Turner

== Bibliography ==
- Bailey, Anthony. J.M.W. Turner: Standing in the Sun. Tate Enterprises, 2013.
- Finley, Gerald. Angel in the Sun; Turner's Vision of History. McGill-Queen's University Press, 1999.
- Hamilton, James (ed.) Turner and Italy. National Galleries of Scotland, 2009.
- Reynolds, Graham. Turner. Thames & Hudson, 2022.

.
