= Royal Academy Exhibition of 1838 =

1838 art exhibition in London

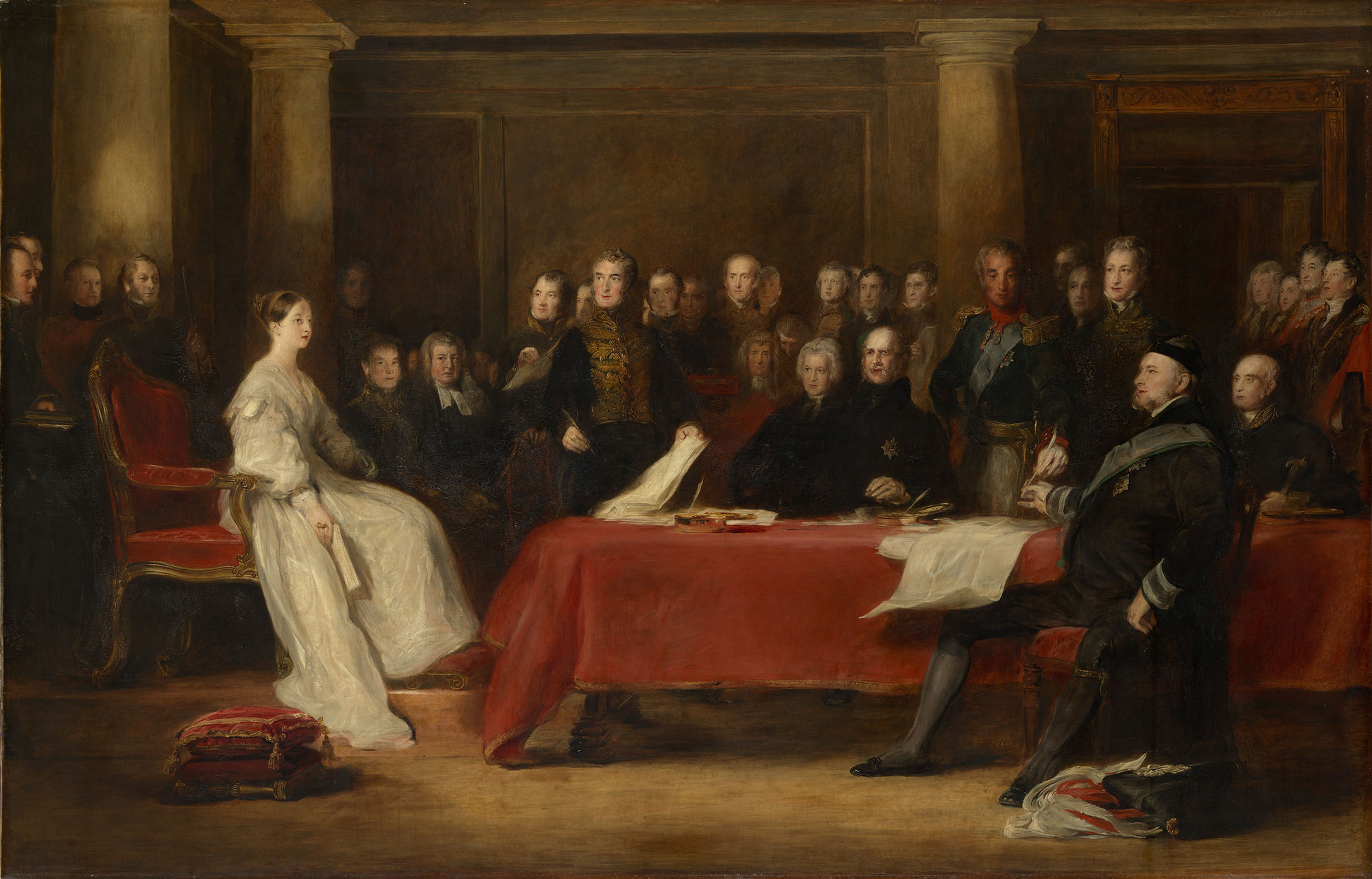
The First Council of Queen Victoria by David Wilkie

The Royal Academy Exhibition of 1838 was the seventieth annual Summer Exhibition of the British Royal Academy of Arts. It was held between 7 May and 28 July 1838 at the National Gallery on Trafalgar Square in London, the second year of was staged there following the move from the Academy's traditional home at Somerset House. It featured submissions from leading painters, sculptors and architects of the early Victorian era.

Queen Victoria had come to the throne the previous year and her coronation took place in June 1838 while the Exhibition was taking place. It was the first Academy Exhibition that Victoria visited as queen. Major attention was drawn to David Wilkie's The First Council of Queen Victoria which depicted Victoria meeting with leading figures of the kingdom at the beginning of her reign. The work has been commissioned by the queen herself, but Wilkie struggled to secure sittings from those who appeared in the painting. Above it hung Queen Victoria Enthroned in the House of Lords a portrait by George Hayter produced for the Guildhall. Hayter would subsequently replace Wilkie in the queen's favour and she later commissioned him to produce paintings of major public events during he reign such as The Marriage of Queen Victoria.

J. M. W. Turner submitted three paintings including the contrasting Ancient Italy and Modern Italy. Amongst the works displayed by Edwin Landseer was A Distinguished Member of the Humane Society. The President of the Royal Academy Martin Archer Shee submitted several portrait paintings including one of the previous monarch William IV.

== Gallery ==
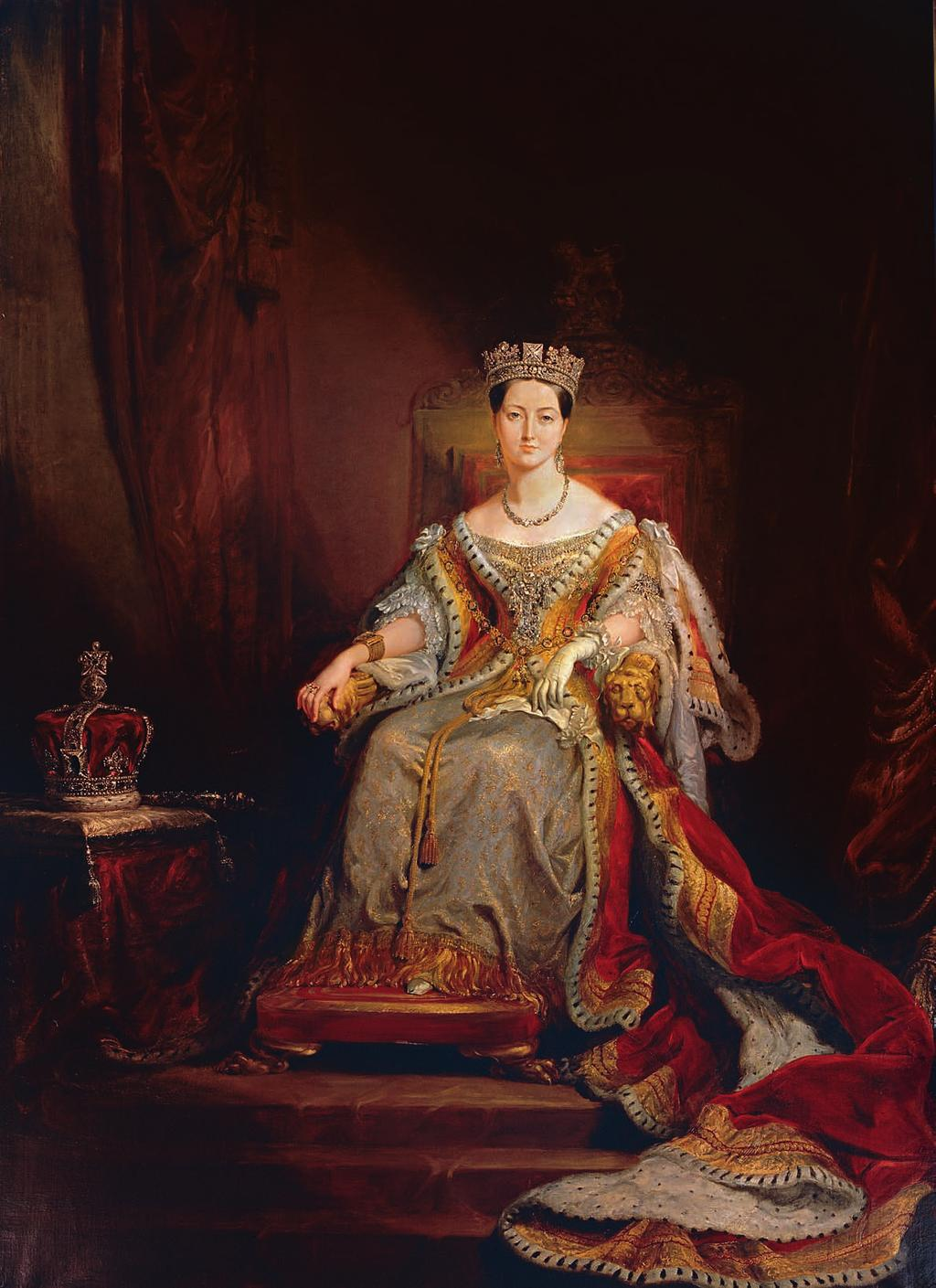
Queen Victoria Enthroned in the House of Lords by George Hayter

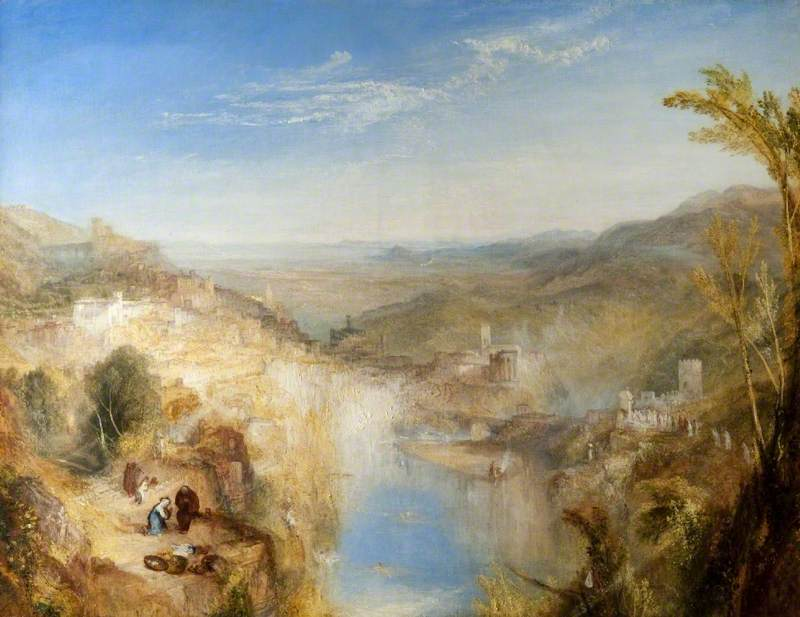
Modern Italy: The Pifferari by J. M. W. Turner

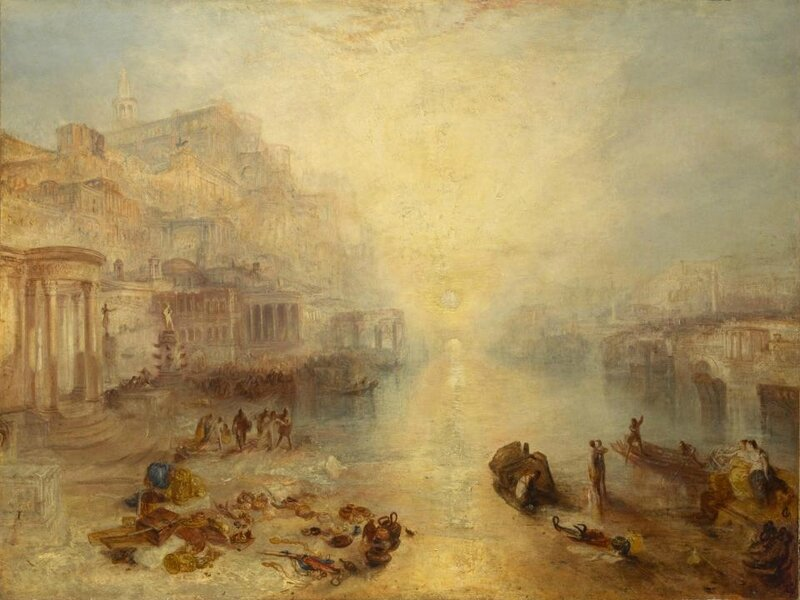
Ancient Italy – Ovid Banished from Rome by J. M. W. Turner

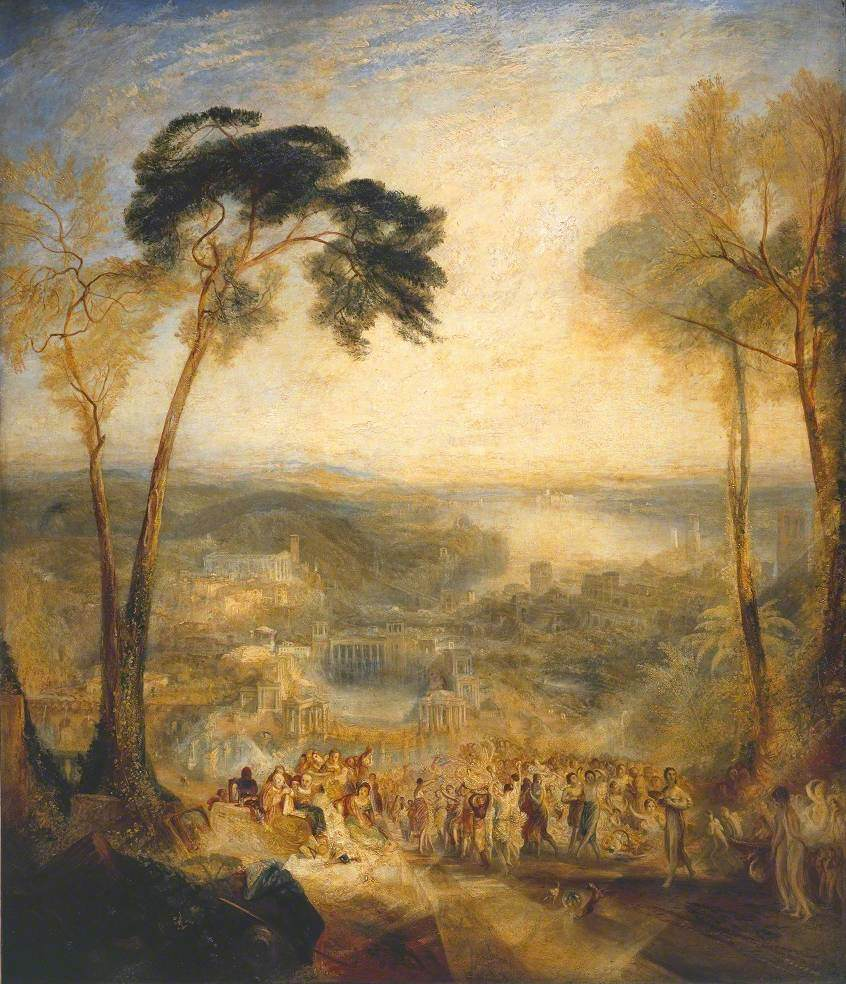
Phryne Going to the Public Baths as Venus by J. M. W. Turner

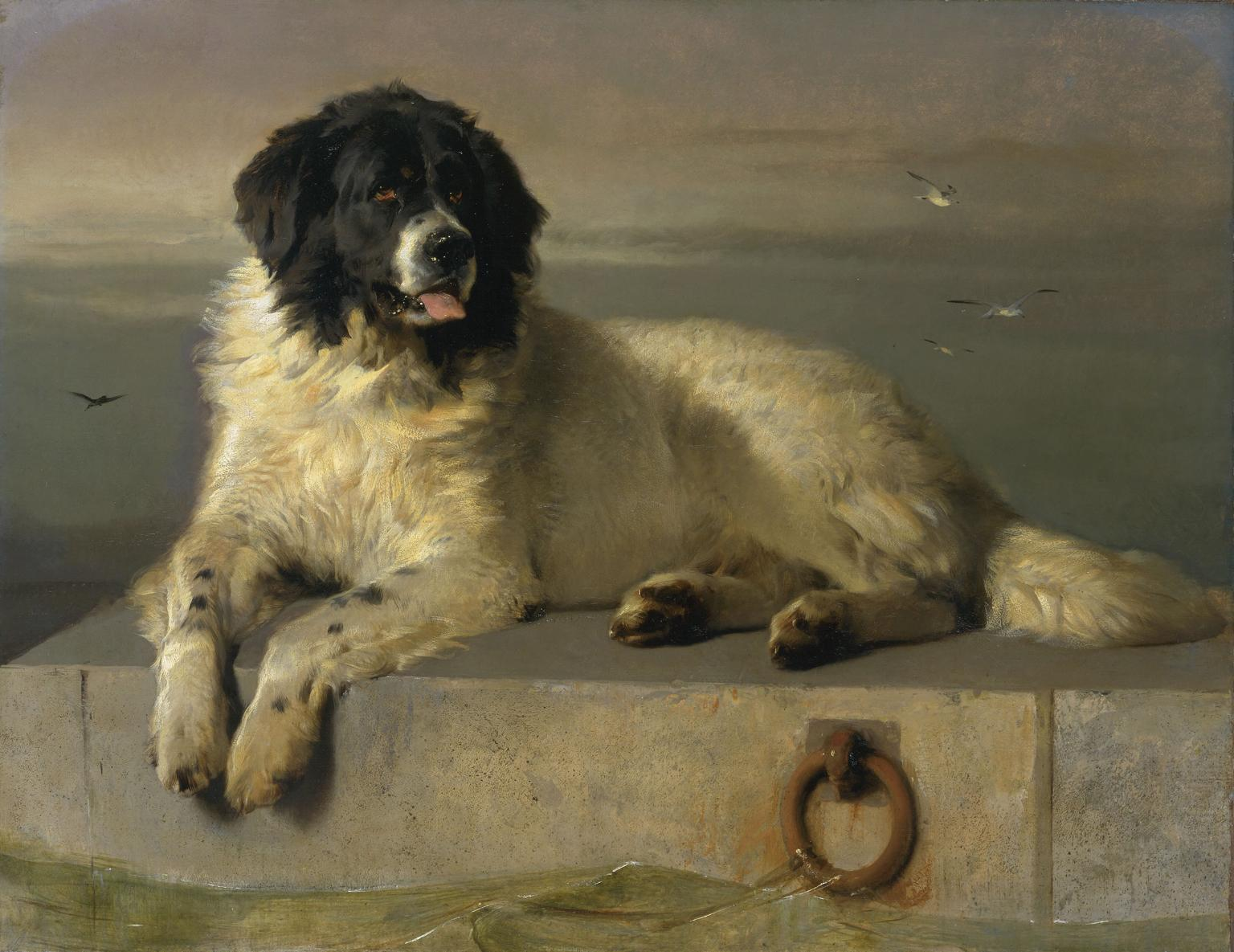
A Distinguished Member of the Humane Society by Edwin Landseer

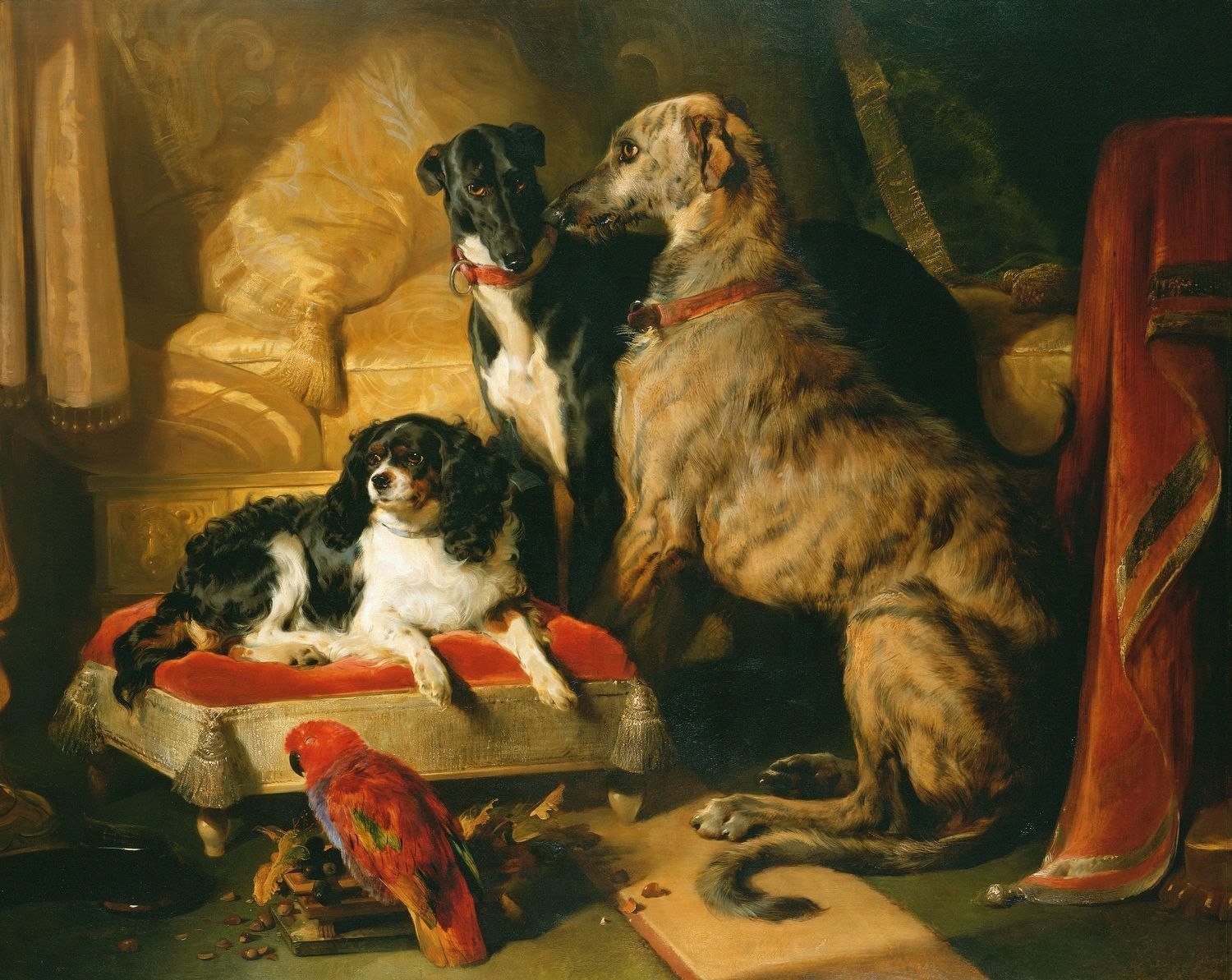
Hector, Nero, and Dash with the parrot, Lory by Edwin Landseer

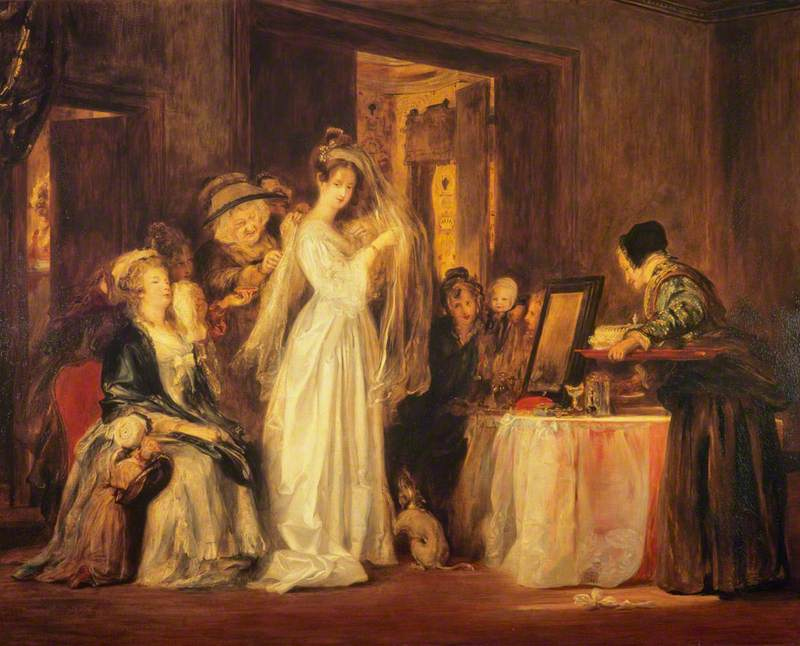
The Bride at her Toilet on the Day of her Wedding by David Wilkie

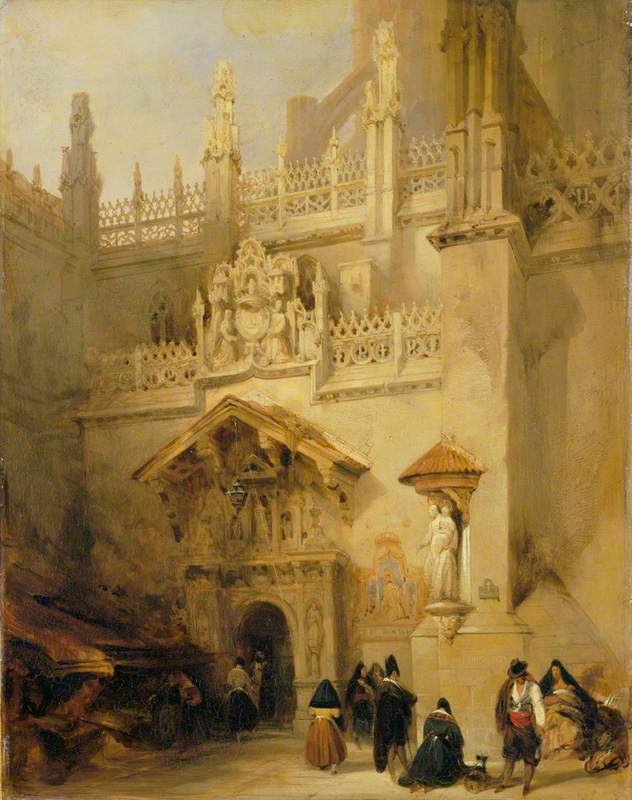
Chapel of Ferdinand and Isabella, Granada by David Roberts

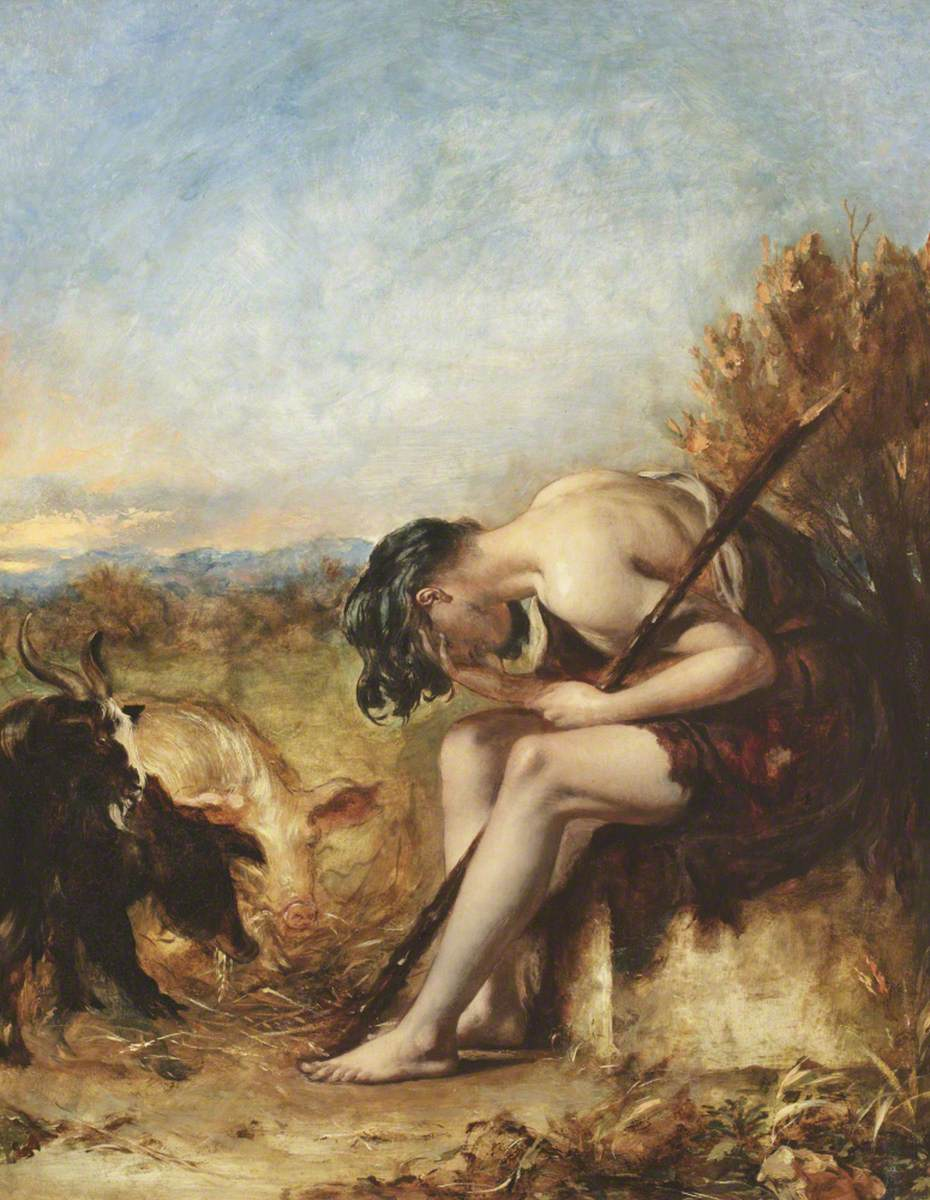
The Progidal Son by William Etty

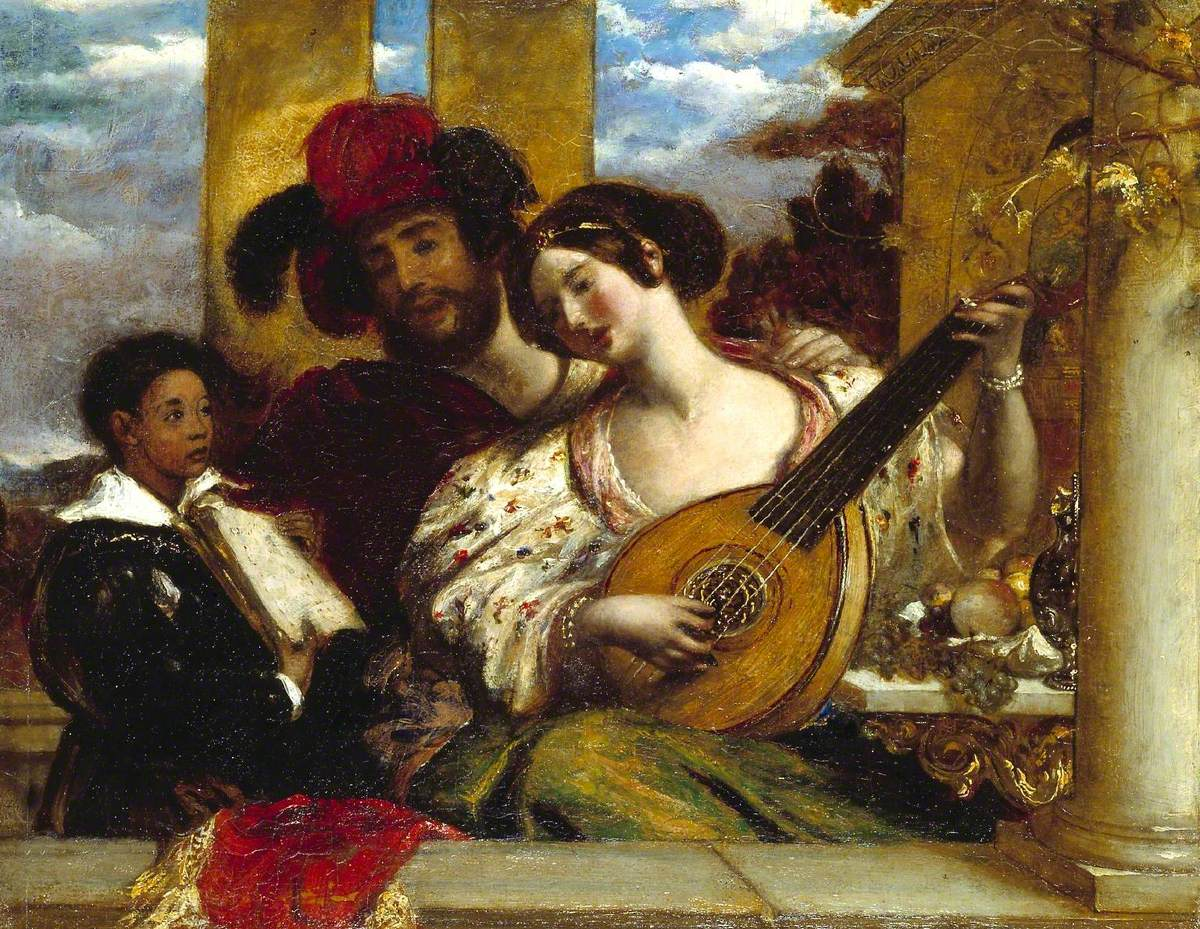
Il Duetto by William Etty

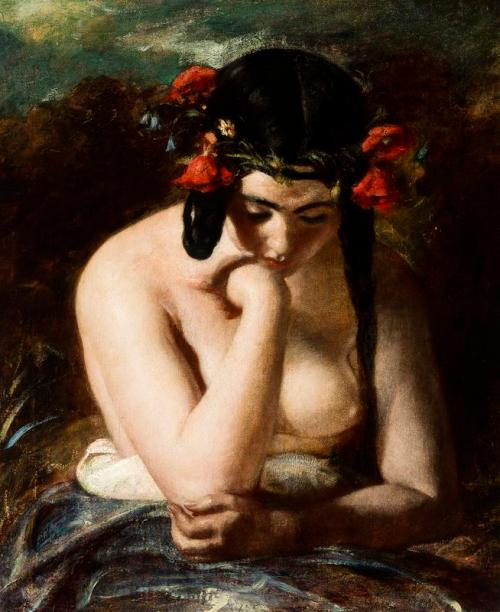
Somnolency by William Etty

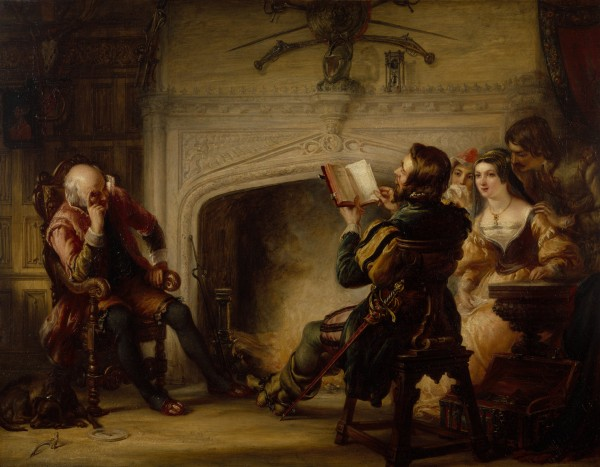
An Early Reading of Shakespeare by Solomon Hart

The Woodranger by Daniel Maclise

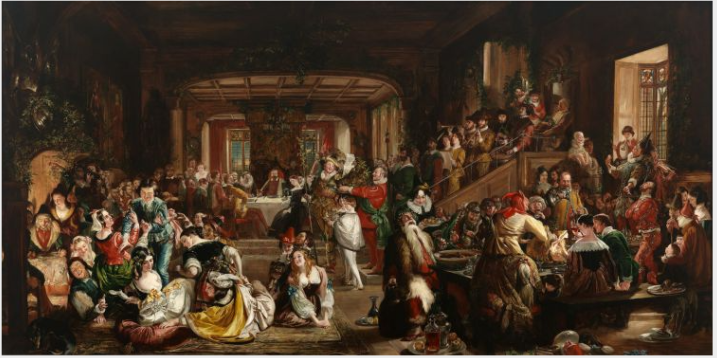
Merry Christmas in the Baron's Hall by Daniel Maclise

The Principle Characters of the Merry Wives of Windsor by Charles Robert Leslie

The Emigrant's Departure by Paul Falconer Poole

The Slave Market, Constantinople by William Allan

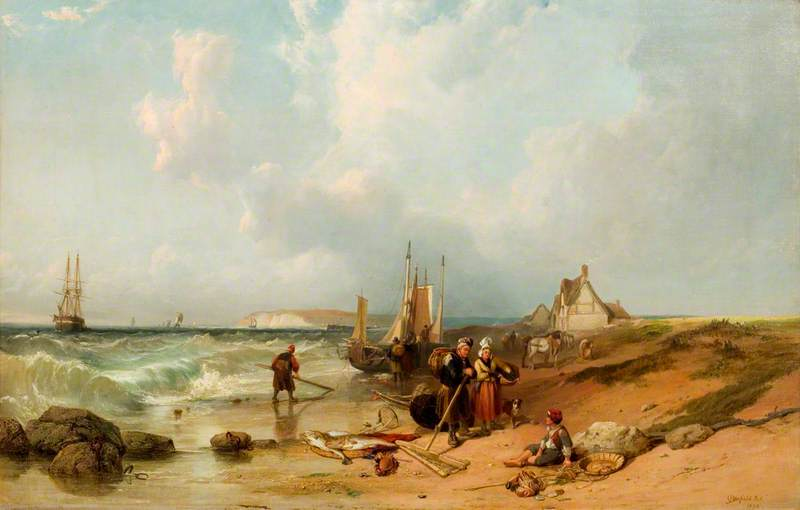
Sands near Boulogne by Clarkson Stanfield

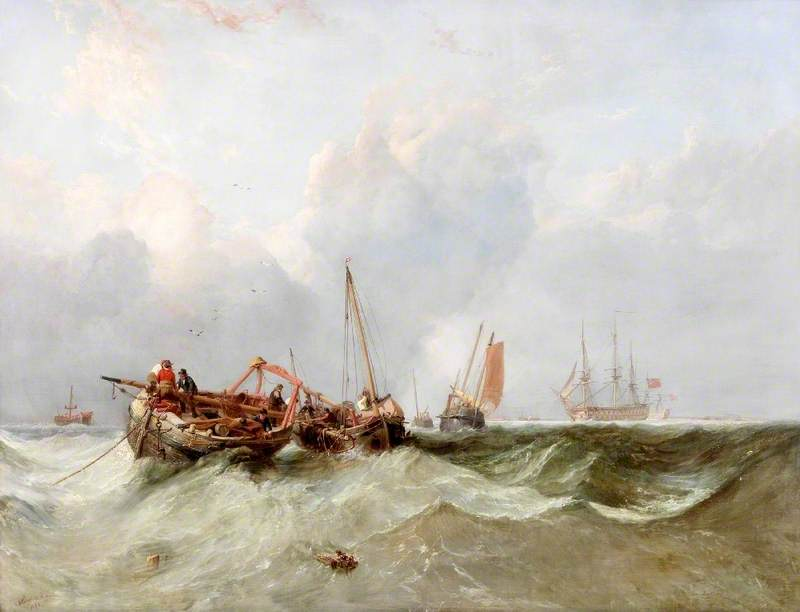
The 'Chasse Mareé' off the Gull Stream Light, the Downs in the Distance by Clarkson Stanfield

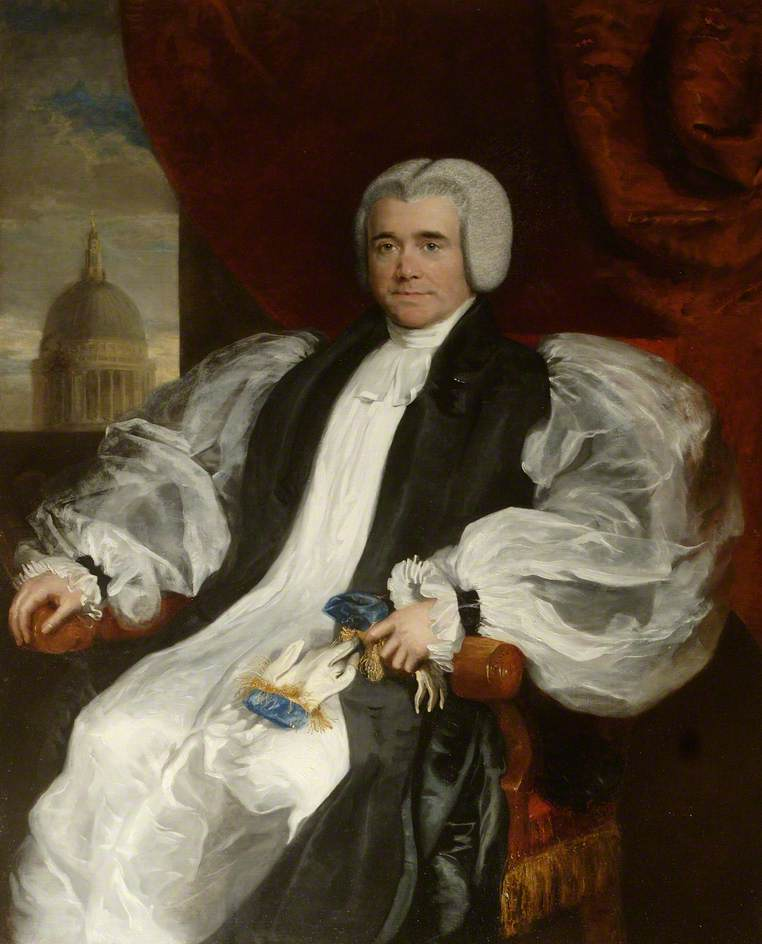
Portrait of Edward Copleston, Bishop of Llandaff by Martin Archer Shee

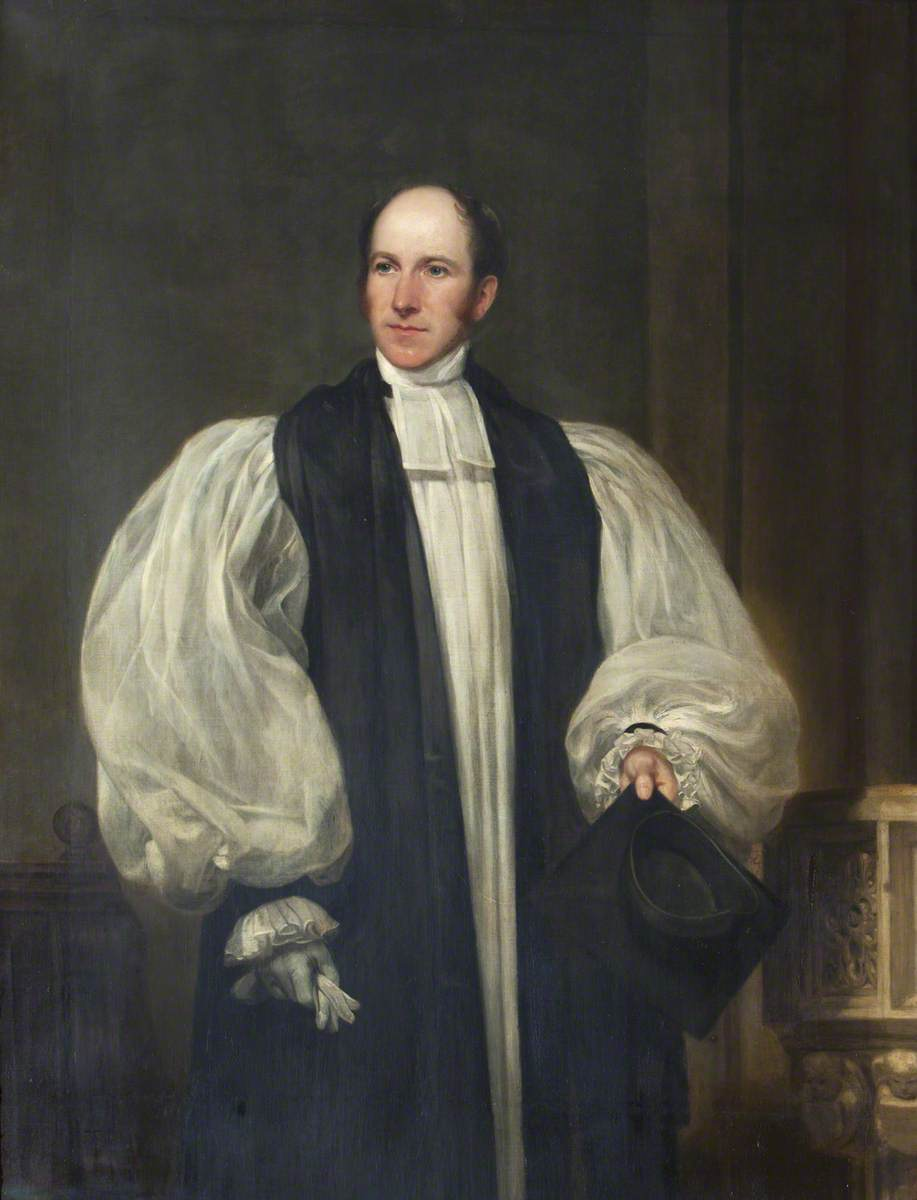
Portrait of Edward Denison, Bishop of Salisbury by Henry William Pickersgill

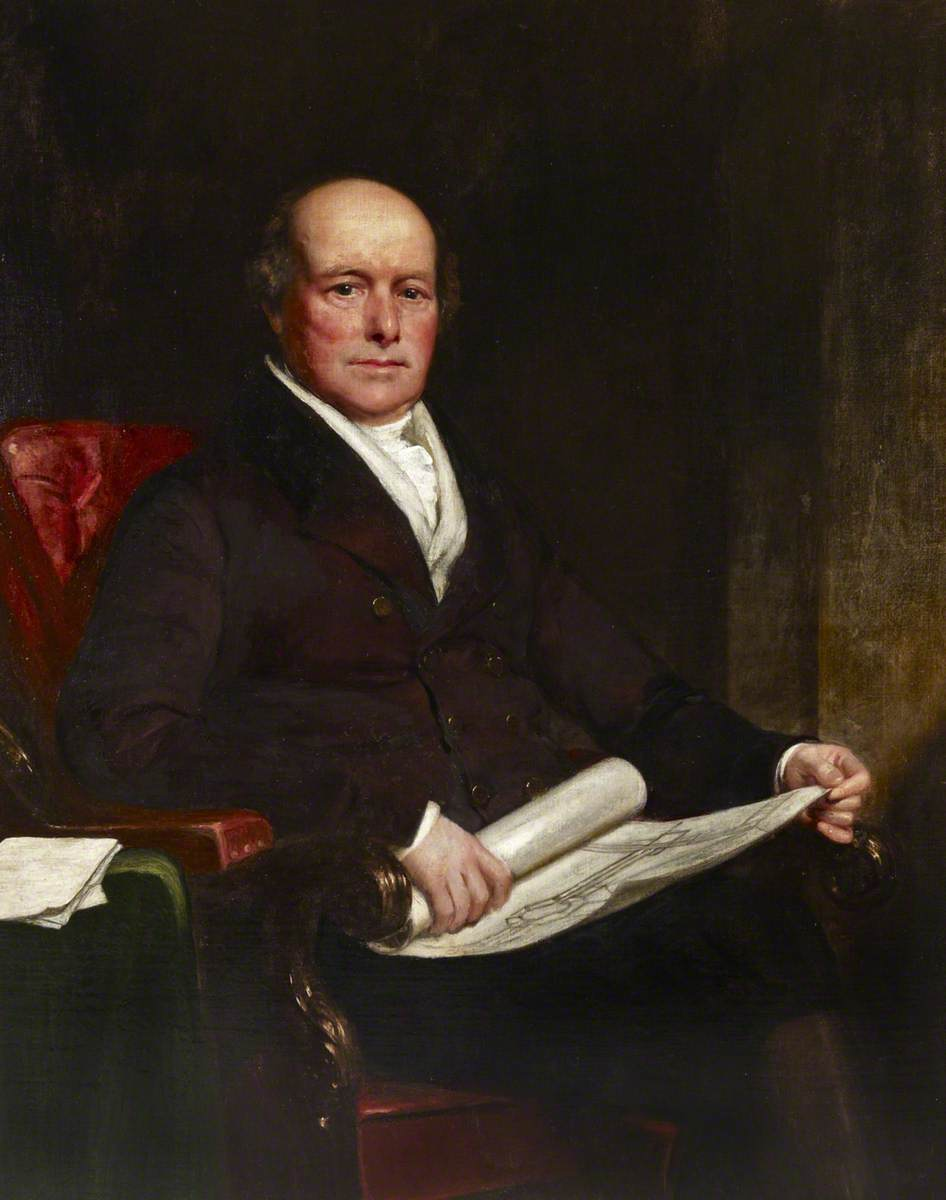
Portrait of James Clitherow by Henry William Pickersgill

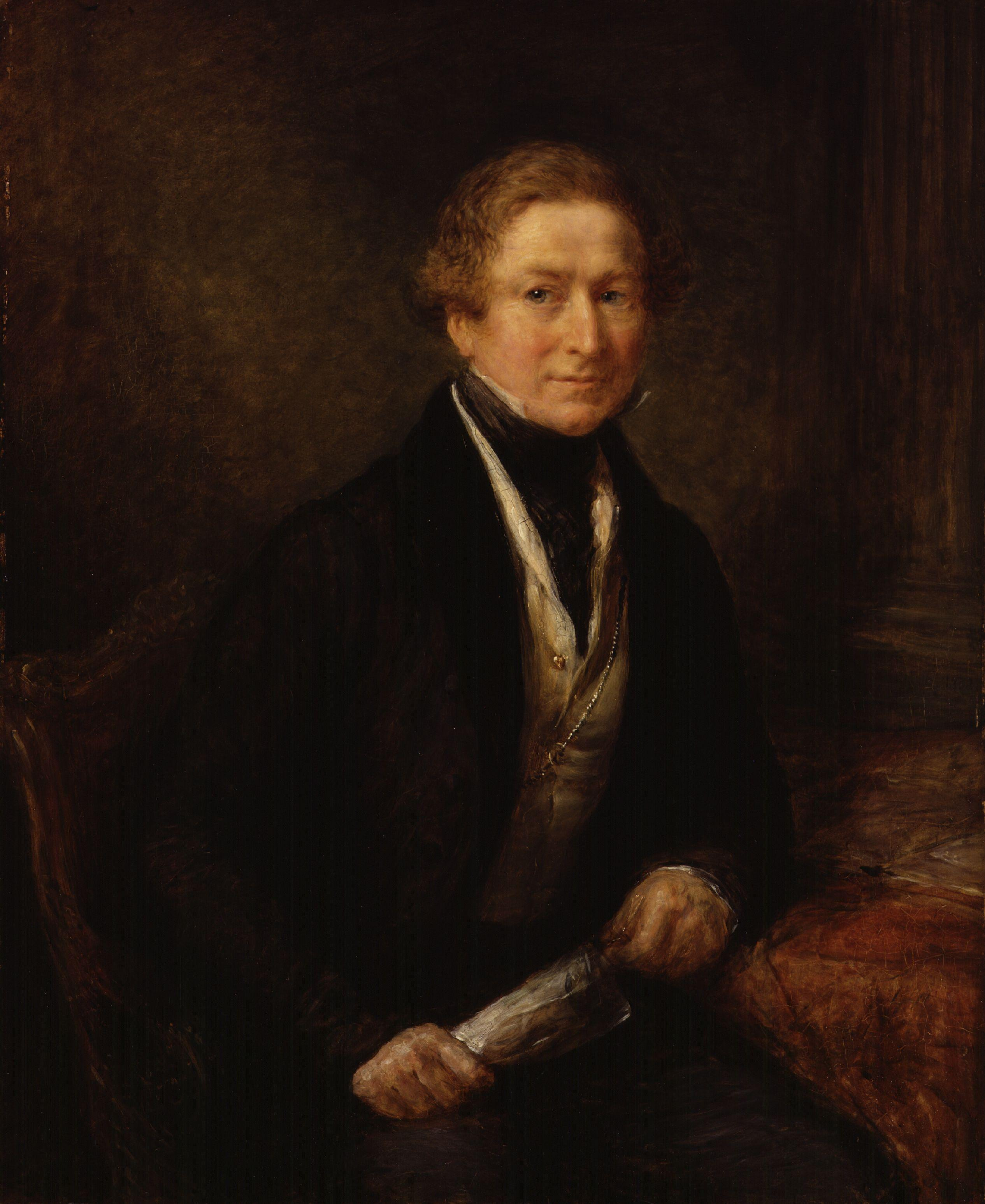
Portrait of Sir Robert Peel by John Linnell

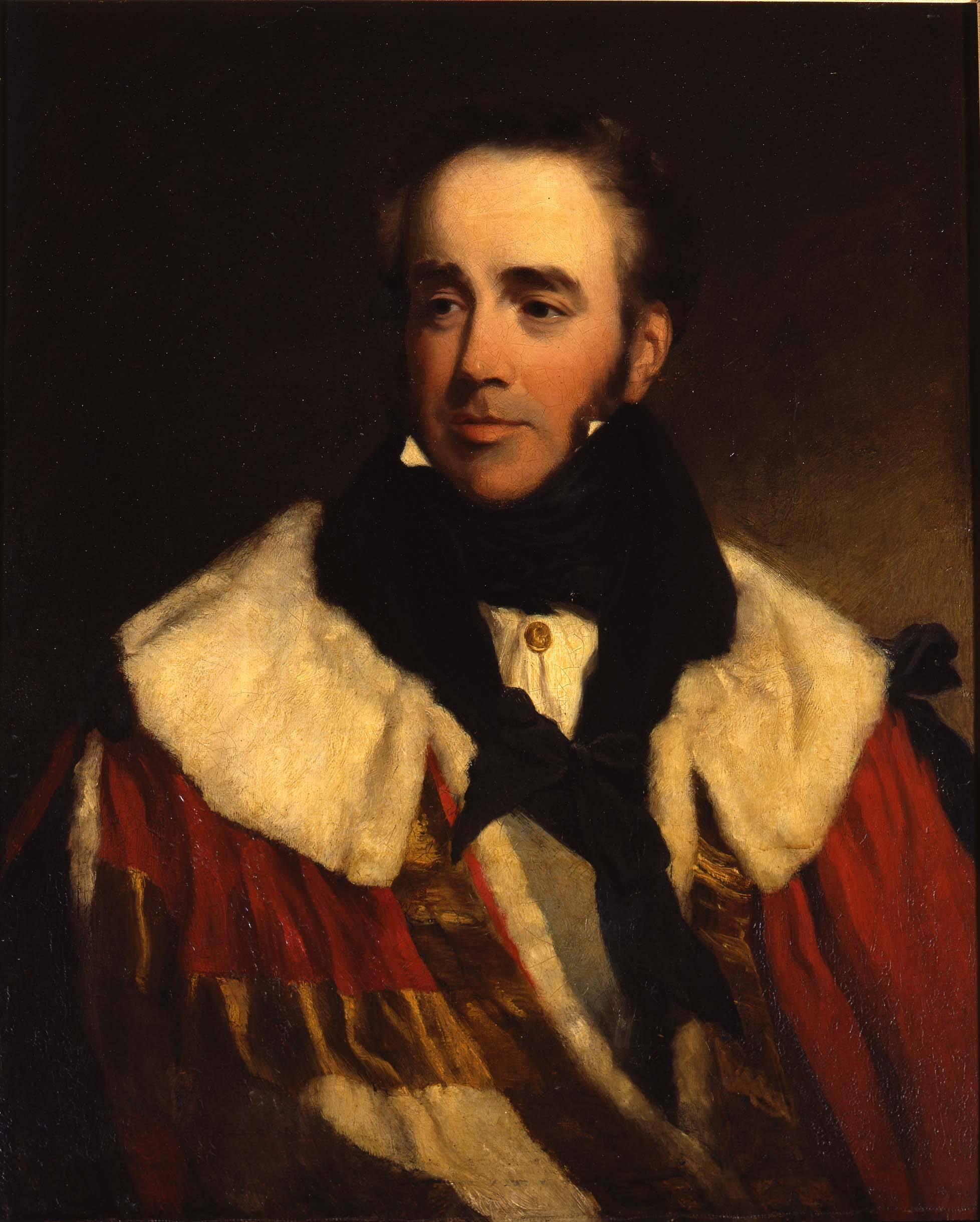
Portrait of the Earl of Roden by Frederick Richard Say

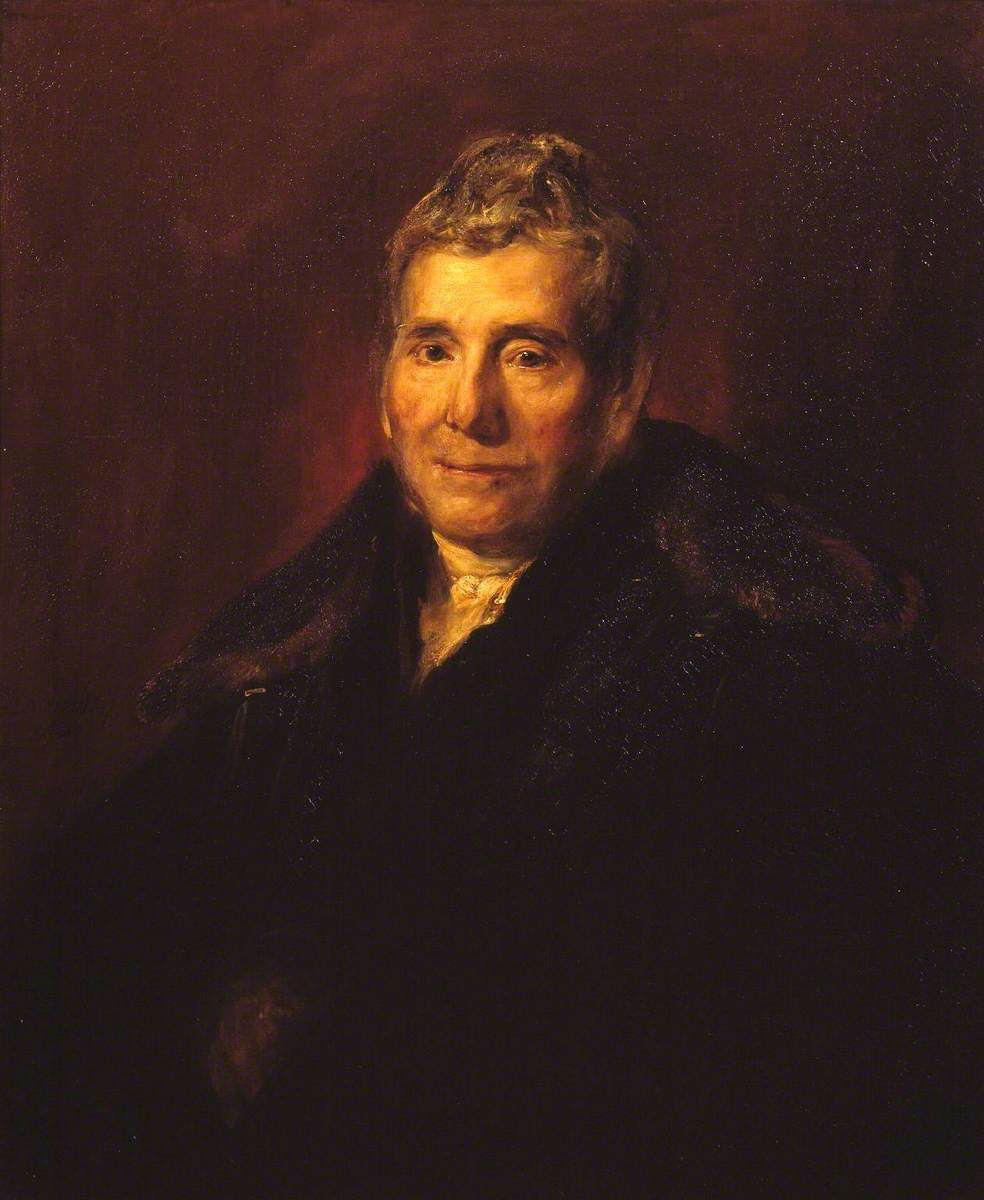
Portrait of Thomas Daniell by David Wilkie

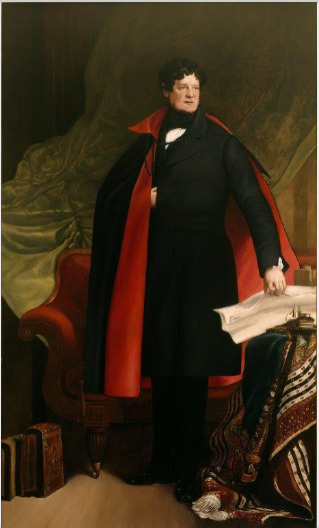
Portrait of Daniel O'Connell by David Wilkie

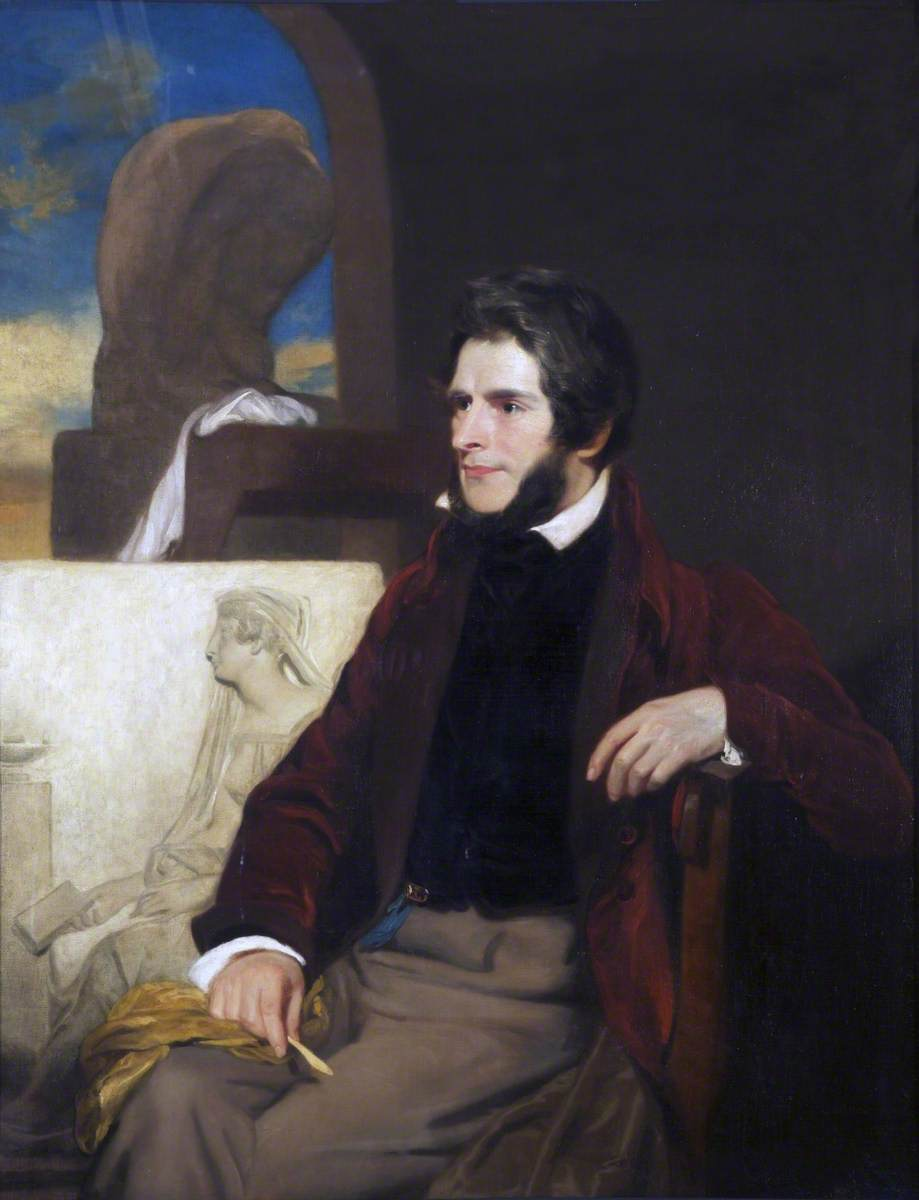
Portrait of John Gibson by Andrew Geddes

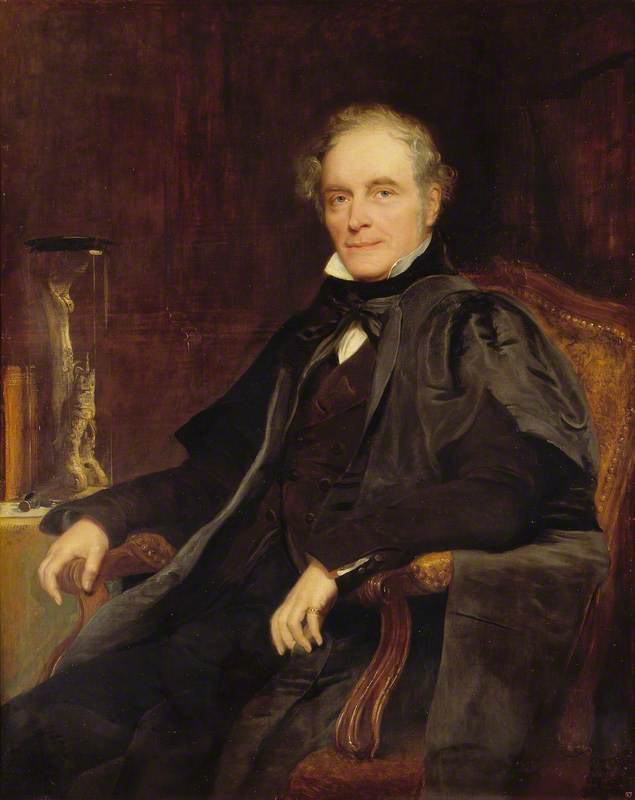
Portrait of Samuel Cooper by Andrew Morton

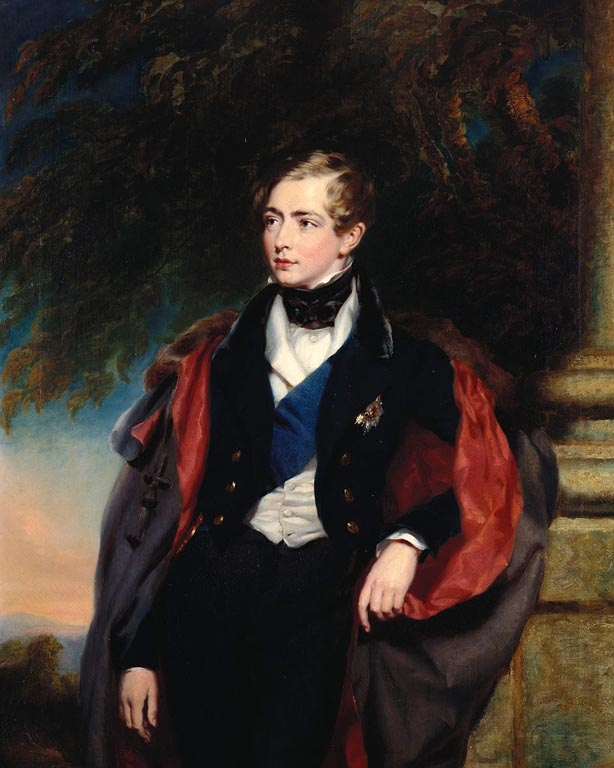
Portrait of Prince George of Cambridge by John Lucas

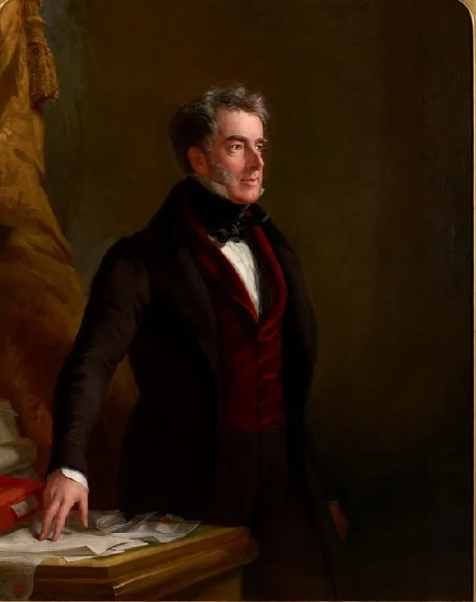
Portrait of Lord Melbourne by George Hayter

== See also ==
- Salon of 1838, a contemporary French exhibition held at the Louvre in Paris

== Bibliography ==
- Forbes, Christopher. The Royal Academy (1837-1901) Revisited: Victorian Paintings from the Forbes Magazine Collection. Forbes, 1975.
- Hamilton, James. Turner - A Life. Sceptre, 1998.
- Ormond, Richard. Sir Edwin Landseer. Philadelphia Museum of Art, 1981.
- Tromans, Nicholas. David Wilkie: The People's Painter. Edinburgh University Press, 2007.
