= An Early Reading of Shakespeare =

Painting by Solomon Hart

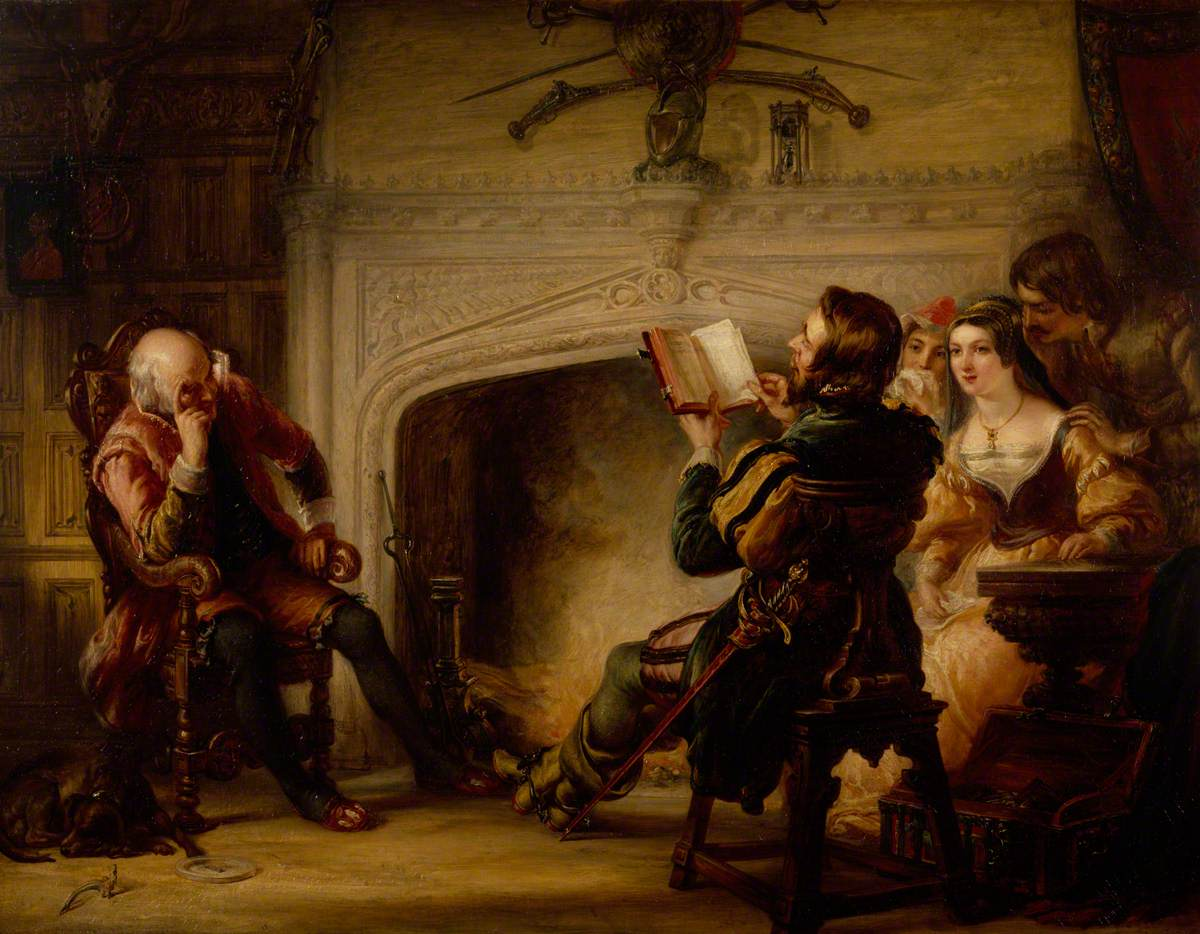
- Artist: Solomon Hart
- Year: 1838
- Type: Oil on canvas, genre painting
- Dimensions: 75 cm × 91.2 cm (30 in × 35.9 in)
- Location: Royal Academy, London

An Early Reading of Shakespeare is an 1838 oil painting by the British artist Solomon Hart depicting a scene in late Elizabethan England. A volume of William Shakespeare's work is being read aloud. Rather than depicting a specific event it shows the general impact of Shakespeare's works as figures listen attentively. The fireplace shown prominently was identical to one Hart had sketched in Wells in 1833.

The painting was displayed at the Royal Academy Exhibition of 1838, held at the National Gallery, in London. When Hart was elected to full membership of the Royal Academy in 1840 he was required to submit a diploma work and chose this painting to present.

== Bibliography ==
- Carlebach Elisheva (ed.) The Posen Library of Jewish Culture and Civilization: Volume 6. Yale University Press, 2012.
- Fry, Helen P. The Jews of Devon and Cornwall: Essays and Exhibition Catalogue. Hidden Legacy Foundation, 2000.
