= Portrait of Daniel O'Connell =

Painting by David Wilkie

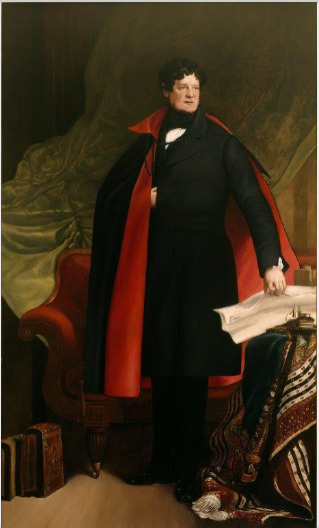
- Artist: David Wilkie
- Year: 1838
- Type: Oil on canvas, portrait painting
- Dimensions: 250 cm × 160 cm (98 in × 63 in)
- Location: National Gallery of Ireland, Dublin

Portrait of Daniel O'Connell is an 1838 portrait painting by the British artist David Wilkie. It depicts the Irish lawyer and politician Daniel O'Connell at full length in his role as a governor of the Bank of Ireland, which he had been a key figure in the founding of in 1835.

A long-standing advocate of Catholic Emancipation which had been achieved under the Duke of Wellington, O'Connell had switched his focus to campaigning for the repeal of the Act of Union of 1800, which has created the United Kingdom. O'Connell championed the reversal of this in which the old Kingdom of Ireland would be restored as a sister Kingdom of Britain under the sovereignty of Queen Victoria. Since 1835 he had wielded particular influence in British politics through the Lichfield House Compact with Lord Melbourne's government.

The Scottish-born London-based Wilkie has made his name with genre paintings that paid homage to the art of the Dutch Golden Age, but developed his style to include portraits and history paintings. He was elected to the Royal Academy in 1811.

The picture was commissioned by an English supporter of O'Connell. Wilkie was paid 300 guineas for the picture which he recorded that O'Connell was pleased by. The picture was displayed at the Royal Academy Exhibition of 1838 held at the National Gallery in London and again at a retrospective exhibition of Wilkie's work held at the British Institution in 1842. Today it is owned by the banking group Natwest, but has been on a long-term loan to the National Gallery of Ireland in Dublin.

== Bibliography ==
- Cullen, Fintan & Barber, Fionna (ed.) The Routledge Companion to Irish Art. Taylor & Francis, 2025.
- Tromans, Nicholas. David Wilkie: The People's Painter. Edinburgh University Press, 2007.
