= Fishing Boats with Hucksters Bargaining for Fish =

Painting by J. M. W. Turner

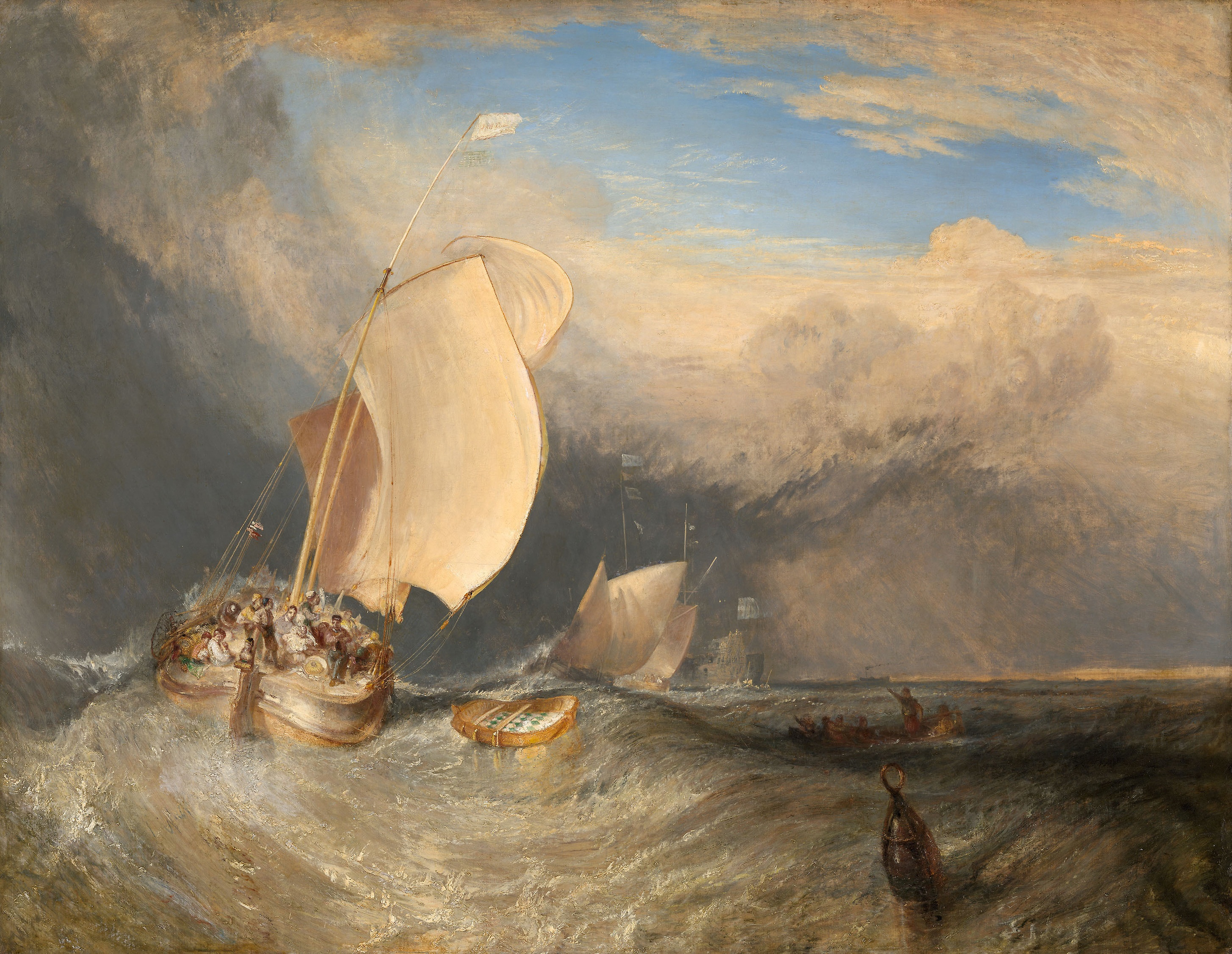
- Artist: J. M. W. Turner
- Year: 1838
- Type: Oil on canvas, landscape painting
- Dimensions: 174.5 cm × 224.9 cm (68.7 in × 88.5 in)
- Location: Art Institute of Chicago; Chicago

Fishing Boats with Hucksters Bargaining for Fish is an 1838 landscape painting by the British artist J. M. W. Turner. A seascape, it shows the crew of a fishing boat engaging in business with a huckster in a smaller boat nearby. In the distance a steam ship can be seen. Stylistically it reflects Turner's long-standing interest in seventeenth century Dutch seascapes, even as he was becoming more experimental and expressive in his own work.

The work was displayed at the British Institution's exhibition of 1838 in the former Boydell Shakespeare Gallery in Pall Mall. The painting is in the collection of the Art Institute of Chicago in Illinois, having been acquired in 1922.

== See also ==
- List of paintings by J. M. W. Turner

== Bibliography ==
- Druick, Douglas. Master Paintings in the Art Institute of Chicago. Yale University Press, 2013.
- Hamilton, James. Turner - A Life. Sceptre, 1998.
- Solkin, David. Turner and the Masters. Tate Britain, 2009.
