= Chapel of Ferdinand and Isabella, Granada =

Painting by David Roberts

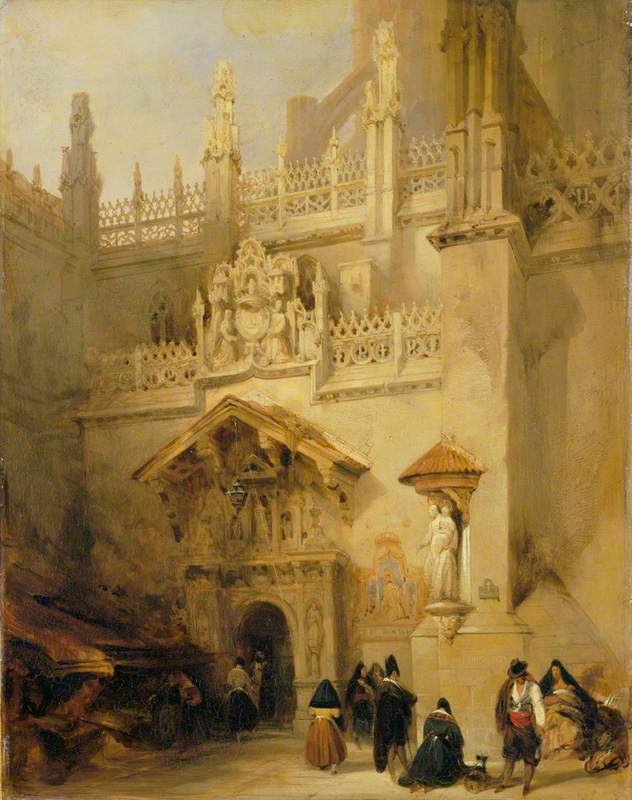
- Artist: David Roberts
- Year: 1838
- Type: Oil on panel, landscape painting
- Dimensions: 47.5 cm × 37.5 cm (18.7 in × 14.8 in)
- Location: Wallace Collection, London

Chapel of Ferdinand and Isabella, Granada is an 1838 landscape painting by the British artist David Roberts. It depicts the Royal Chapel of Granada, on the southern side of Granada Cathedral in Spain. The chapel is the burial place of the Catholic Monarchs Ferdinand II and Isabella known for their role in the Reconquista and European Discovery of the Americas.

Roberts, initially a scene painter in London's West End, drew growing praise for his landscape paintings. He visited Spain in 1832-33 and spent three weeks in Granada. He later became celebrated for his Orientalist depictions of the Middle East and was elected a member of the Royal Academy of Arts.

The work was displayed at the Royal Academy Exhibition of 1838 at the National Gallery in London (a similarly titled work had appeared two years earlier at the 1836 exhibition)The painting is now in the Wallace Collection in Marylebone, having been purchased by the Marquess of Hertford in 1863.

== Bibliography ==
- Guiterman, Helen. David Roberts, 1796-1864, Artist, Adventurer. Scottish Arts Council, 1981.
- Hopkins, Claudia. Art and Identity in Spain, 1833–1956: The Orient Within. Bloomsbury, 2024.
- Ingamells, John. The Wallace Collection: British, German, Italian, Spanish. Wallace Collection, 1985.
- Sim, Katherine. David Roberts R.A., 1796–1864: A Biography. Quartet Books, 1984.
