= Portrait of Sir Robert Peel =

Painting by John Linnell

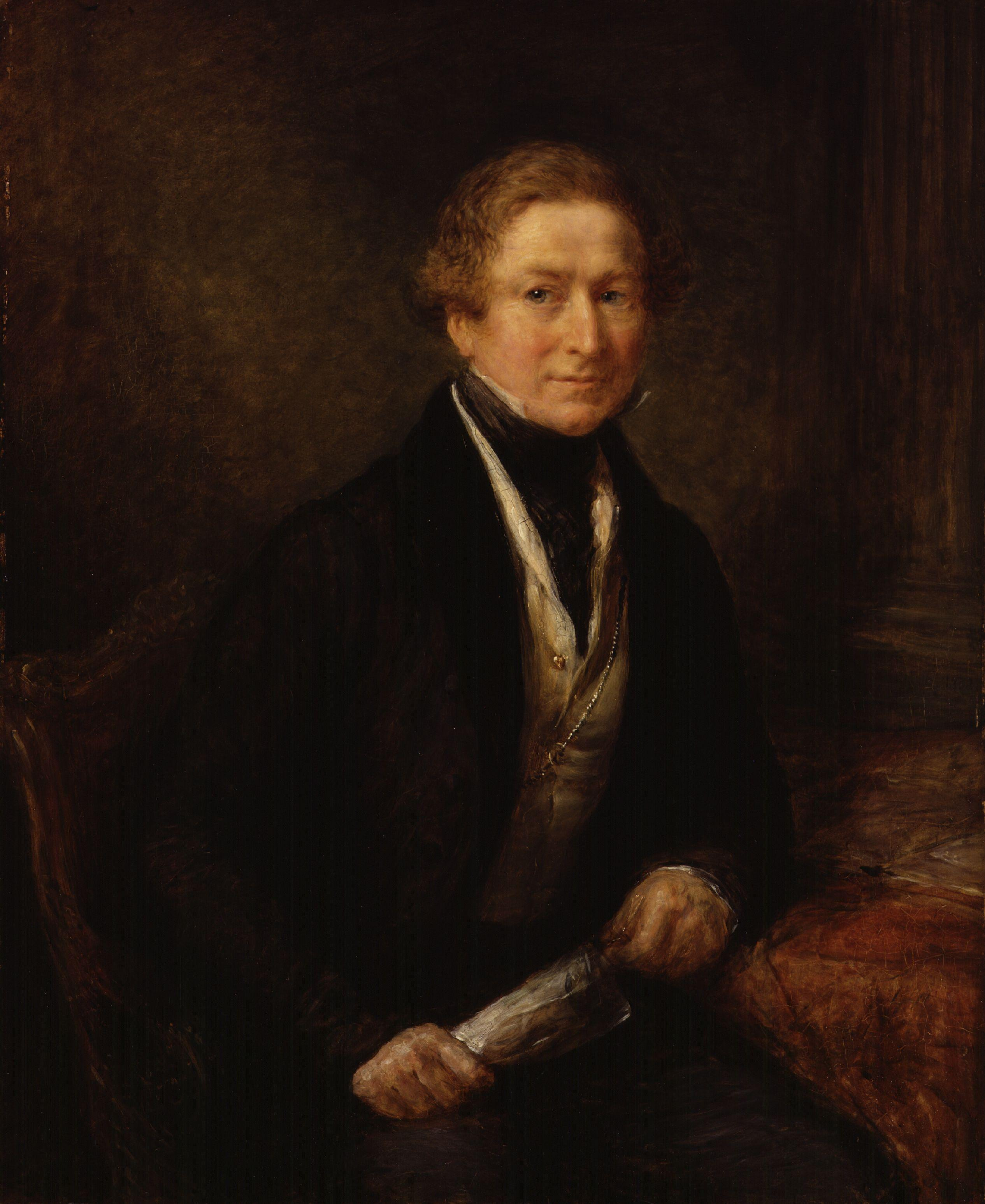
- Artist: John Linnell
- Year: 1838
- Type: Oil on panel, portrait
- Dimensions: 45.5 cm × 37.8 cm (17.9 in × 14.9 in)
- Location: National Portrait Gallery, London

Portrait of Sir Robert Peel is an 1838 portrait painting by the English artist John Linnell depicting the British politician Sir Robert Peel.

The son of a Northern cotton manufacturer, Peel rose to the top of the Tory party during the Regency era, serving as Irish secretary and home secretary. Closely associated with his political ally the Duke of Wellington, Peel served twice as prime minister, first in 1834–1835 and then for a longer spell between 1841 and 1846 during the early Victorian era.

Peel, a patron of the arts, was painted by a number of different artists. Linnell's work, when he was Leader of the Opposition, is one of the best known images of him. It was exhibited at the Royal Academy's Summer Exhibition of 1838. Painted as oil-on-panel, a separate 1840 oil-on-canvas version was in the collection of the Peel family. It is now in the collection of the National Portrait Gallery off Trafalgar Square in London, having been purchased in 1887.

== See also ==
- Portrait of Julia, Lady Peel, an 1827 portrait of the sitter's wife by Thomas Lawrence

== Bibliography ==
- Ormond, Richard. Early Victorian Portraits: Text. National Portrait Gallery, 1974.
- Story, Alfred Thomas. The Life of John Linnell, Volume 2. Richard Bentley and Son, 1892.
