= Convulsionists of Tangiers =

Painting by Eugène Delacroix

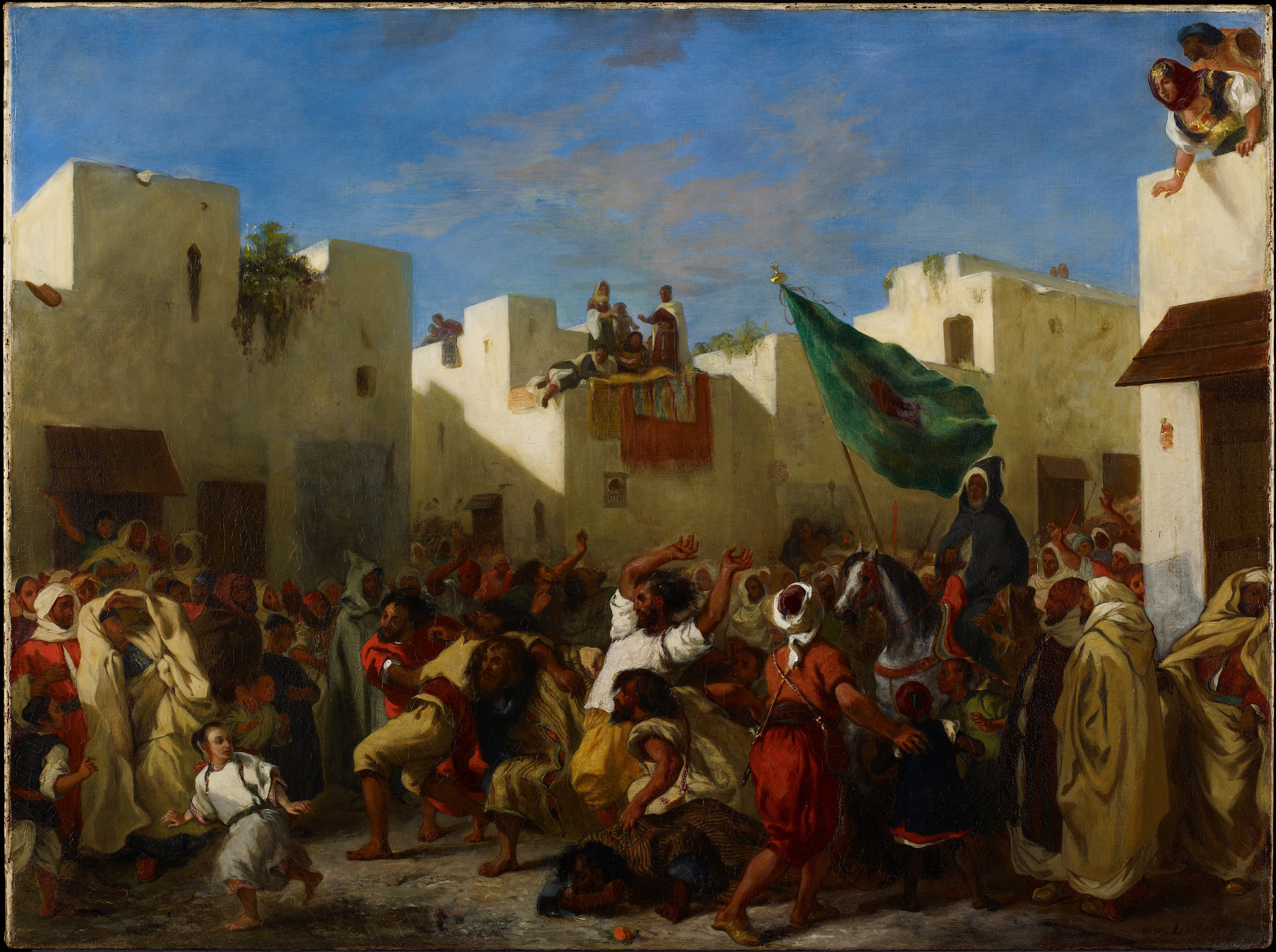
- Artist: Eugène Delacroix
- Year: 1837–38
- Medium: Oil on canvas
- Dimensions: 95.5 cm × 128.5 cm cm (37.6 in × 50.6 in in)
- Location: Minneapolis Institute of Art; Minneapolis

Convulsionists of Tangiers (also The Fanatics of Tangier) is an 1837–38 painting by the French Romantic visual artist Eugène Delacroix. It is held by the Minneapolis Institute of Art.

== History ==
In 1832, while in Morocco as part of a French diplomatic mission, Delacroix witnessed the devotional activities of members of the Isawiyya brotherhood in Tangiers.

Initially the artist did a sketch from his memories of the event, then later several watercolors, and finally four of five years later this painting.
