= The First Council of Queen Victoria =

Painting by David Wilkie

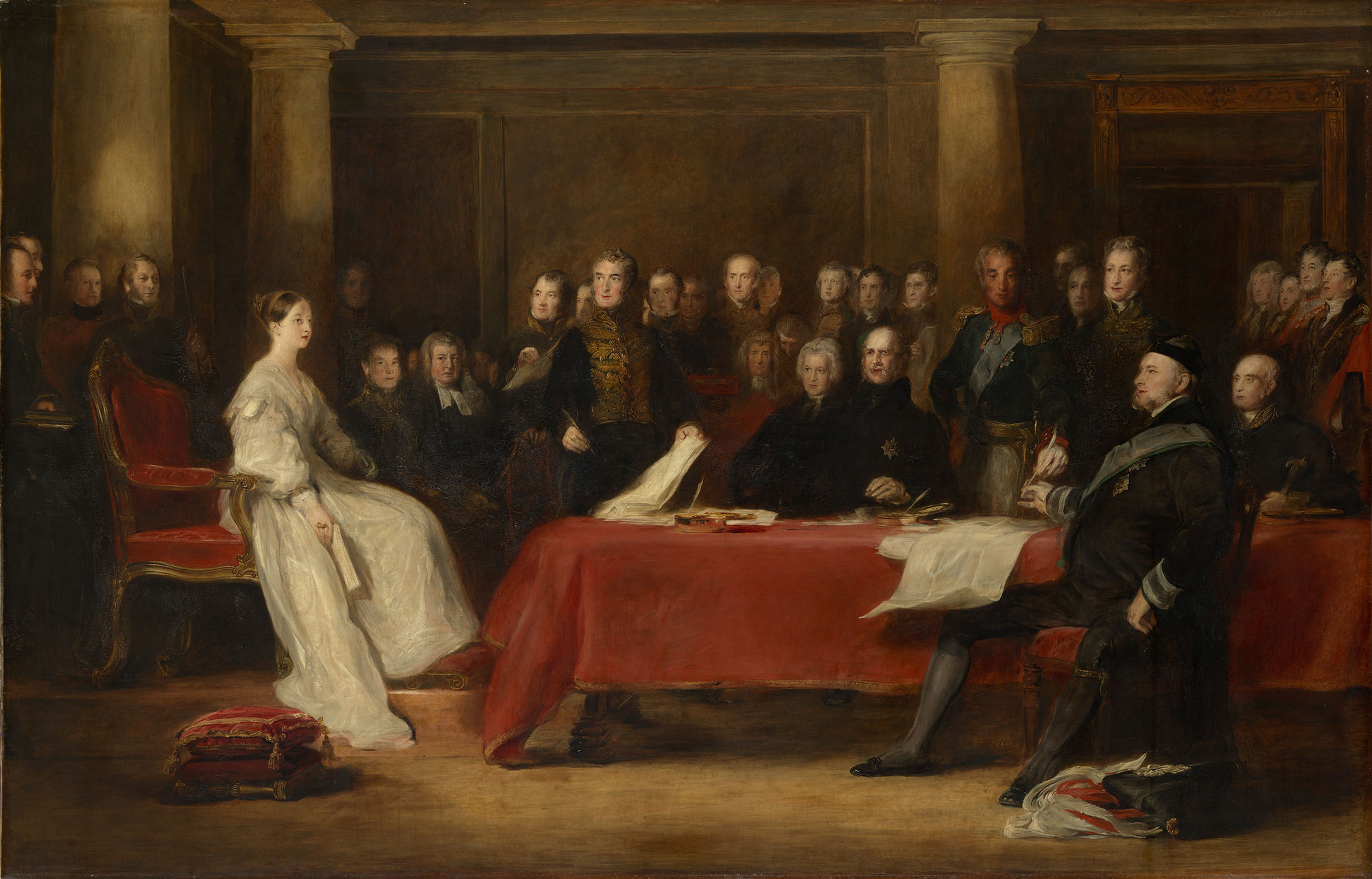
- Artist: David Wilkie
- Year: 1838
- Type: Oil on canvas, history painting
- Dimensions: 153 cm × 240 cm (60.1 in × 94 in)
- Location: Royal Collection, Kensington Palace, London

The First Council of Queen Victoria is an 1838 history painting by the Scottish artist David Wilkie. It depicts the first meeting of the Privy Council following the succession of Queen Victoria to the throne following the death of her uncle William IV. It represents the actual meeting that took place in the Red Saloon at Kensington Palace on 20 June 1837, when the eighteen year-old queen met with senior politicians from both the governing Whig Party and the opposition Tories.

== People depicted ==
Those depicted include several former and future Prime Ministers as well as the current incumbent Lord Melbourne. The other premiers include the Duke of Wellington, Earl Grey, Lord John Russell, Lord Aberdeen, Lord Palmerston, and Sir Robert Peel. Other notable figures include the politicians the Marquess of Anglesey, the Marquess of Lansdowne, Lord Holland, Lord Lyndhurst, John Wilson Croker as well as Sir Thomas Kelly, the Lord Mayor of London. Charles Greville the diarist who offers one of the best written accounts of the scene is also shown.

Seated at the centre of the table is Victoria's uncle Ernst Augustus, Duke of Cumberland who became King of Hanover on his brother William's death as the Guelphic Law restricted the succession of woman. Another of the Queen's uncles, the Duke of Sussex, is also present seated at the opposite end of the table from Victoria. The general impression of those elder statesman and royals is to emphasise Victoria's youth and femninity.

== Painting ==
Victoria expressly requested that Wilkie paint it and had strong ideas about who should be included. Wilkie felt under increasing pressure as it became clear the young Queen expected it to be completed in time for the Royal Academy's next Summer Exhibition beginning the following May. Wilkie had to schedule sittings with the various subjects in the painting, many of whom were busy public figures.

Wilkie appears to have drawn inspiration from paintings of the young Jesus in the temple lecturing the elders. He shows Victoria, the only woman on the room and by far the youngest, seated on a dias and dressed in white to emphasise her purity and innocence in sharp contrast to distinguish her from the darker clad experienced politicians. In reality she had worn mourning black for her uncle on the occasion.

Working against the clock, Wilkie was able to complete it in time to be displayed at the Royal Academy Exhibition of 1838 at Somerset House. The Spectator noted it was the centre of attention at the exhibition and was widely discussed by critics, although the painting's reception was mixed. Victoria was dissatisfied with the result considering it to be inaccurate and, although she purchased the work, in future turned to George Hayter for major ceremonial paintings. His works include The Coronation of Queen Victoria (1839) and The Marriage of Queen Victoria (1842).

It was hanging in the Grand Corridor of Windsor Castle in 1860 and today remains part of the Royal Collection on display at Kensington Palace.

== See also ==
- Portrait of Queen Victoria, an 1840 painting by Wilkie

== Bibliography ==
- Homans, Margaret & Munich, Adrienne. Remaking Queen Victoria. Cambridge University Press, 1997.
- Kinzler, Julia. Representing Royalty: British Monarchs in Contemporary Cinema, 1994–2010. Cambridge Scholars Publishing, 2018.
- Plunkett, John. Queen Victoria: First Media Monarch. Oxford University Press, 2003.
- Tromans, Nicholas. David Wilkie: The People's Painter. Edinburgh University Press, 2007.
