= Queen Victoria Enthroned in the House of Lords =

Painting by George Hayter

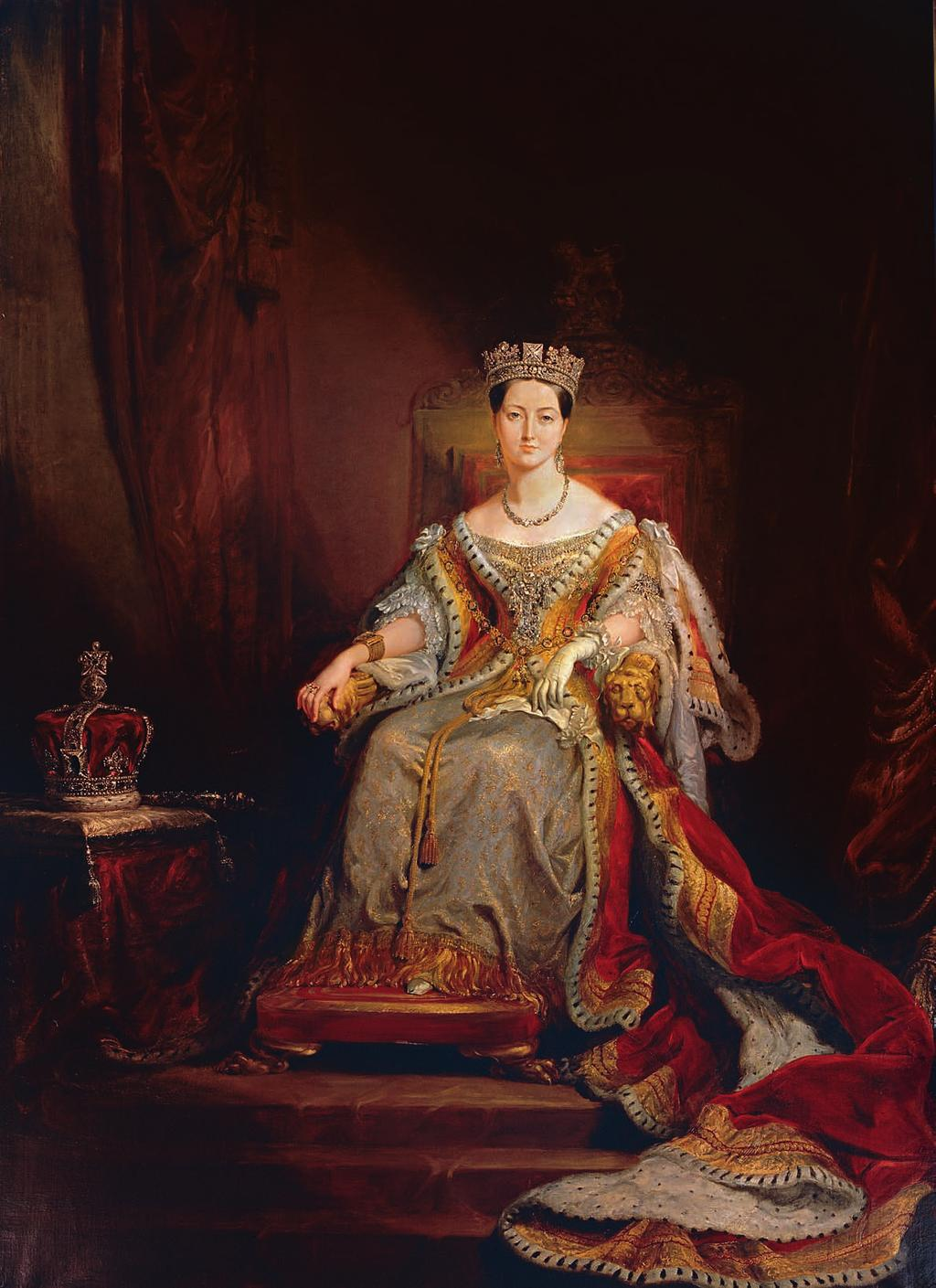
- Artist: George Hayter
- Year: 1838
- Type: Oil on canvas, portrait painting
- Dimensions: 269 cm × 221 cm (106 in × 87 in)
- Location: Guildhall Art Gallery, London

Queen Victoria Enthroned in the House of Lords is an 1838 portrait painting by the English artist George Hayter. It depicts Queen Victoria sitting on the throne in the House of Lords. Contemporaries reviews criticised it for making the young queen look too severe. The Examiner felt the painting was "too formal, grave and determined in the assumed expression to do justice to that open, lively and gregarious character". The work was displayed at the Royal Academy's Summer Exhibition of 1838.

Today the painting is in the collection of the Guildhall Art Gallery, having been presented by Victoria to the City of London in 1839. Hayter produced two different paintings of the queen that year. The other, showing the queen seated at Westminster Abbey on the day of her Coronation, remains in the Royal Collection. A copy of this, produced by Hayter in 1863, is now in the National Portrait Gallery.

== Bibliography ==
- Plunkett, John. Queen Victoria: First Media Monarch. Oxford University Press, 2003.
