= Time in Nigeria =

West African Time (WAT)

- Time zone: West Africa Time
- Initials: WAT
- UTC offset: UTC+01:00
- Standard meridian: 15th meridian east
- Adopted: 1 September 1919

Daylight saving time
- DST not observed

tz database
- Africa/Lagos

Nigeria observes West Africa Time (WAT), which is one hour ahead of Coordinated Universal Time (UTC+01:00), year-round as standard time. Nigeria has never observed daylight saving time. It shares WAT with fourteen other countries in Africa. Nigeria's local mean time was UTC+00:13:35.

Prior to 1 January 1914, Nigeria was not unified; the Southern Nigeria Protectorate and the Northern Nigeria Protectorate were separate entities. Lagos, the capital of the Southern Nigeria Protectorate, first adopted the standard time of Greenwich Mean Time (UTC+00:00) on 1 July 1905, but reverted to local mean time on 1 July 1908. After the protectorates were amalgamated, UTC+00:30 was adopted nationwide. On 1 September 1919, Nigeria adopted UTC+01:00 as it was seen as a more accurate offset from Greenwich Mean Time.

== History ==
Nigeria's local mean time was UTC+00:13:35. Greenwich Mean Time (GMT; UTC+00:00) was adopted as the standard time of capital Lagos in the Southern Nigeria Protectorate—a protectorate of the British Empire—on 1 July 1905, however Lagos reverted to local mean time on 1 July 1908. The Southern and Northern Nigeria Protectorates were amalgamated to form the Colony and Protectorate of Nigeria on 1 January 1914. Accordingly, UTC+00:30 was adopted as the universal standard time of the newly unified Nigeria.

On 28 August 1919, the first reading of the Ordinance to amend the Interpretation Ordinance, 1914 bill to switch Nigeria's time zone to UTC+01:00 took place. The acting legal adviser stated it was proposed that a common method of expressing time throughout the British Empire be adopted so that the "Military, Naval, and Air Services may use the same time," and that the proposal was "that the Globe should be divided into twelve zones East and West of Greenwich, of one hour each, Nigeria falling into the zone with a standard of one hour fast on Greenwich Mean Time." The bill passed on 1 September 1919, with Nigeria accordingly adopting UTC+01:00 as its new standard time.

== Geography ==
Nigeria is located between both the meridians of UTC+00:00 and UTC+01:00, but chooses to observe the latter. Nigeria's standard meridian—and thus the standard meridian of West Africa Time—is located at the 15th meridian east.

== IANA time zone database ==
In the IANA time zone database, Nigeria is given one zone in the file zone.tab—Africa/Lagos. Lagos is Nigeria's largest city, a major African financial centre, the most populous urban area on the African continent, and one of the fastest-growing megacities in the world. "NG" refers to the country's ISO 3166-1 alpha-2 country code. Data for Nigeria directly from zone.tab of the IANA time zone database; columns marked with * are the columns from zone.tab itself:

c.c.*	coordinates*	TZ*	Comments	UTC offset	DST
NG	+0627+00324	Africa/Lagos	West Africa Time	+01:00	+01:00

Computers which do not support "Africa/Lagos" may use the older POSIX syntax: TZ="WAT-1".

== See also ==
- Time in Africa
- List of time zones by country
