= Sandringham time =

Time zone on UK royal estates, 1901–1936

Sandringham time is the name given to the idiosyncratic alterations that King Edward VII made to the timekeeping at the royal estate of Sandringham. This time corresponds to UTC+00:30, and was used between 1901 and 1936.

Contrary to rumour, it was not begun to assist Queen Alexandra, who was constantly late, but as a form of daylight saving time to "create" more evening daylight for hunting in the winter.

Edward VII ordered that all the clocks on the estate be set half an hour ahead of Greenwich Mean Time. In later years the practice was also observed at Windsor and Balmoral. The custom of Sandringham time continued after the death of Edward VII, through the reign of his son George V. However, because of the confusion that the time difference caused, which was heightened during George V's final hours, Edward VIII abolished the tradition during his brief reign. None of the subsequent monarchs chose to restore the tradition.
