= Edward VII =

King of the United Kingdom from 1901 to 1910

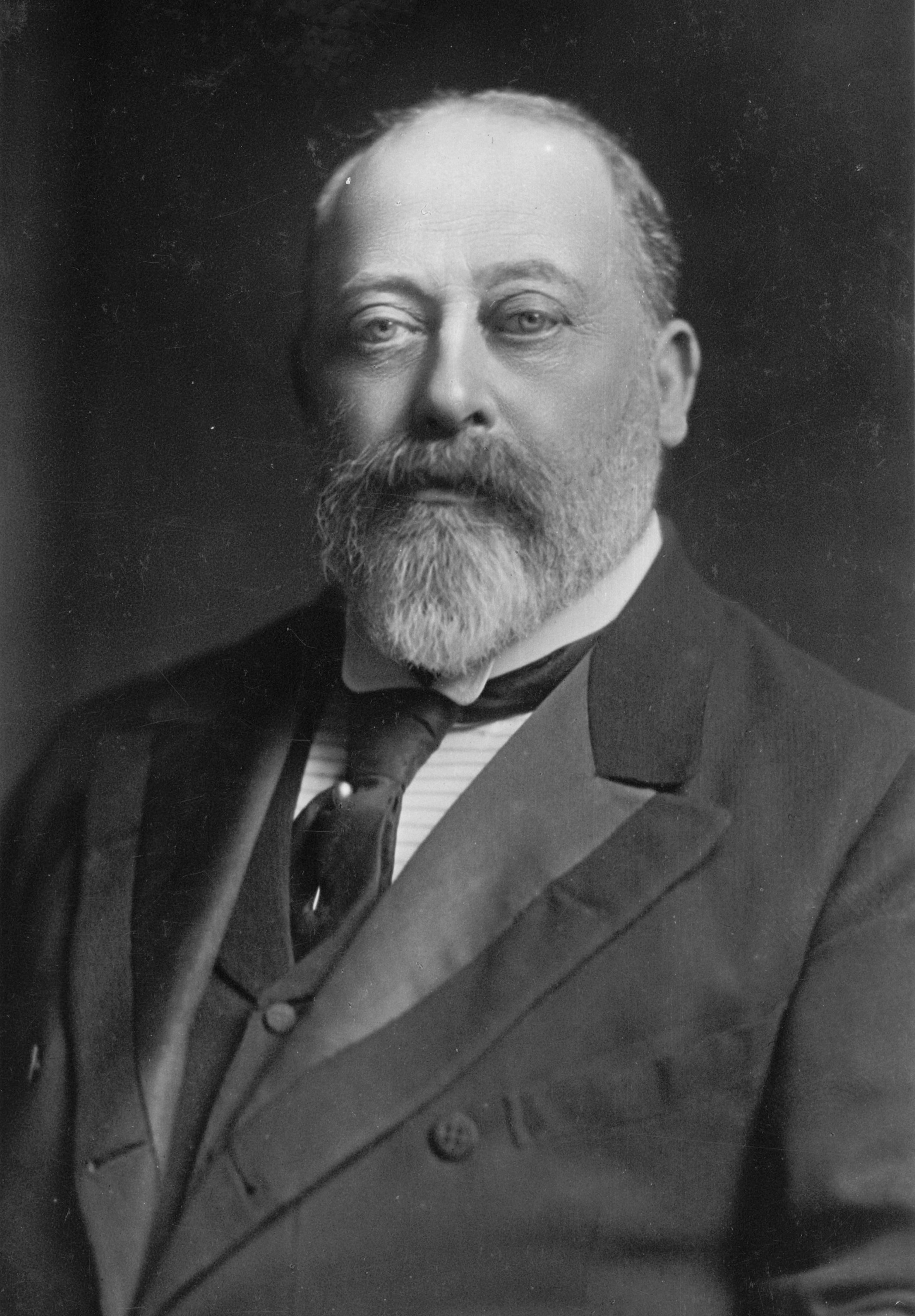
- Formal portrait, c. 1900s

King of the United Kingdom and the British Dominions; Emperor of India
- Reign: 22 January 1901 – 6 May 1910
- Coronation: 9 August 1902
- Imperial Durbar: 1 January 1903
- Predecessor: Victoria
- Successor: George V
- Born: 9 November 1841; Buckingham Palace, London, England
- Died: 6 May 1910 (aged 68); Buckingham Palace, London, England
- Burial: 20 May 1910 Royal Vault, St George's Chapel, Windsor Castle: 28 November 1925 Albert Memorial Chapel, St George's Chapel; 22 April 1927 South Aisle, St George's Chapel
- Spouse: Alexandra of Denmark (m. 1863)
- Issue Detail: Prince Albert Victor; George V; Louise, Princess Royal; Princess Victoria; Maud, Queen of Norway; Prince Alexander John of Wales
Names
- Albert Edward
- House: Saxe-Coburg and Gotha
- Father: Prince Albert of Saxe-Coburg and Gotha
- Mother: Queen Victoria
- Religion: Protestant

Edward VII (Albert Edward; 9 November 1841 – 6 May 1910) was King of the United Kingdom and the British Dominions, and Emperor of India, from 22 January 1901 until his death in 1910.

The second child and eldest son of Queen Victoria and Prince Albert of Saxe-Coburg and Gotha, Edward, nicknamed "Bertie", was Prince of Wales and heir apparent to the British throne for almost 60 years. During his mother's long reign, he was largely excluded from political influence and came to personify the leisured elite. He married Princess Alexandra of Denmark in 1863; the couple had six children. As Prince of Wales, Edward travelled throughout Britain performing ceremonial public duties and represented Britain on visits abroad. His tours of North America in 1860 and of the Indian subcontinent in 1875 proved popular successes. Despite this public approval, his reputation as a playboy prince soured his relationship with his mother.

Edward inherited the throne on his mother's death in 1901. He proved to be an effective constitutional monarch whose reign strengthened the popularity of the British monarchy. He played a role in the modernisation of the British Home Fleet and the reorganisation of the British Army after the Second Boer War of 1899 to 1902. He re-instituted traditional ceremonies as public displays and broadened the range of people with whom royalty socialised. He fostered good relations between Britain and other European countries, especially France, for which he was popularly called "Peacemaker", but his relationship with his nephew, German Emperor Wilhelm II, was poor.

The Edwardian era, which covered Edward's reign and was named after him, coincided with the start of a new century and heralded significant changes in technology and society, including steam turbine propulsion and the rise of socialism. Edward died in the midst of a constitutional crisis that was resolved by the Parliament Act 1911, which restricted the power of the unelected House of Lords. Edward was succeeded as king by his only surviving son, George V.

== Early life and education ==
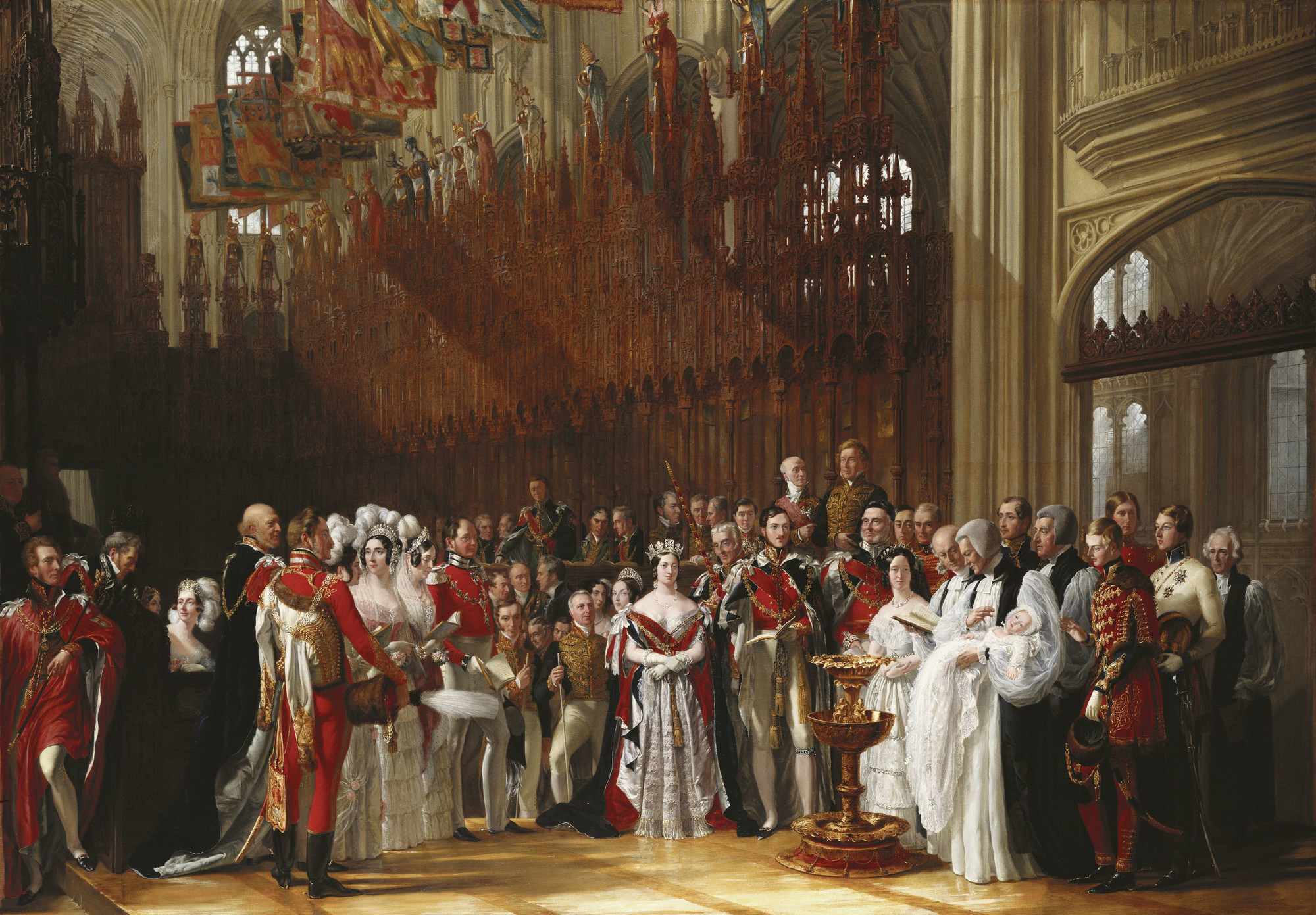
The Christening of the Prince of Wales in St. George's Chapel, Windsor, 25 January 1842

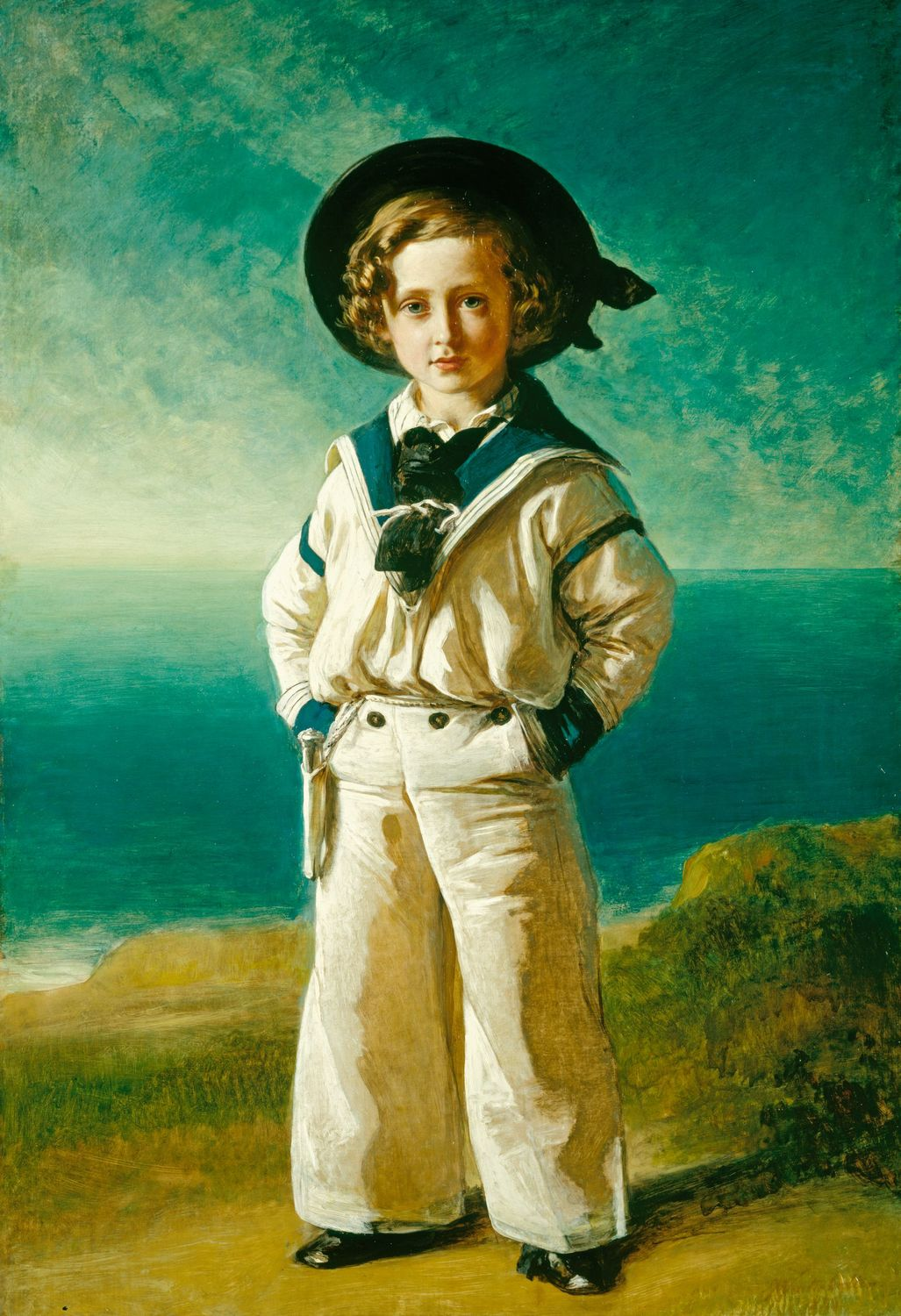
Portrait of Edward by Franz Xaver Winterhalter, 1846

Edward was born at 10:48 am on 9 November 1841 at Buckingham Palace, London, the eldest son and second child of Queen Victoria and her husband, Prince Albert of Saxe-Coburg and Gotha. He was christened Albert Edward at St George's Chapel, Windsor Castle, on 25 January 1842. (Note: His godparents were the King of Prussia, his paternal step-grandmother the Duchess of Saxe-Coburg and Gotha (for whom the Duchess of Kent, his maternal grandmother, stood proxy), his great-uncle the Duke of Cambridge, his step-great-grandmother the Dowager Duchess of Saxe-Coburg-Altenburg (for whom the Duchess of Cambridge, his great-aunt, stood proxy), his great-aunt Princess Sophia (for whom Princess Augusta of Cambridge, his first cousin once-removed, stood proxy) and his great-uncle Prince Ferdinand of Saxe-Coburg and Gotha.) He was named Albert after his father and Edward after his maternal grandfather, Prince Edward, Duke of Kent and Strathearn. He was known as "Bertie" to the royal family throughout his life.

The Queen and Prince Albert were determined that their eldest son should have an education that would prepare him to be a model constitutional monarch. At age seven, Edward embarked on a rigorous educational programme devised by Albert, and supervised by several tutors. Unlike his elder sister Victoria, he did not excel in his studies. He tried to meet the expectations of his parents, but to no avail. Although Edward was not a diligent student – his true talents were those of charm, sociability and tact – Benjamin Disraeli described him as informed, intelligent and of sweet manner. After the completion of his secondary-level studies, his tutor Frederick Waymouth Gibbs was replaced by Robert Bruce as his personal governor.

After an educational trip to Rome, undertaken in the first few months of 1859, Edward spent the summer of that year studying at the University of Edinburgh under, among others, the chemist Lyon Playfair. In October, he matriculated as an undergraduate at Christ Church, Oxford. Now released from the educational strictures imposed by his parents, he enjoyed studying for the first time and performed satisfactorily in examinations. In 1861, he transferred to Trinity College, Cambridge, where he was tutored in history by Charles Kingsley, Regius Professor of Modern History. Kingsley's efforts brought forth the best academic performances of Edward's life, and Edward actually looked forward to his lectures.

== Early adulthood ==
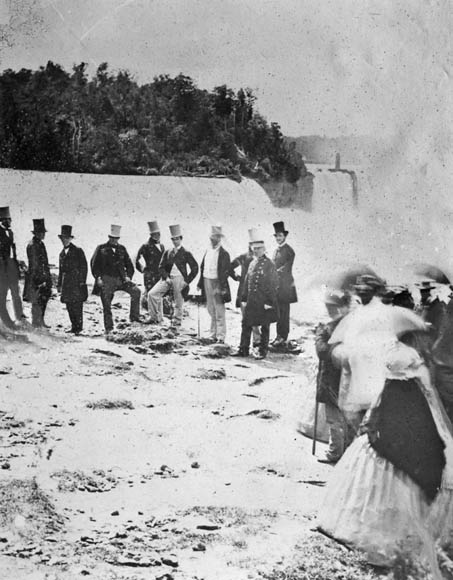
Edward and his entourage at Niagara Falls, 1860

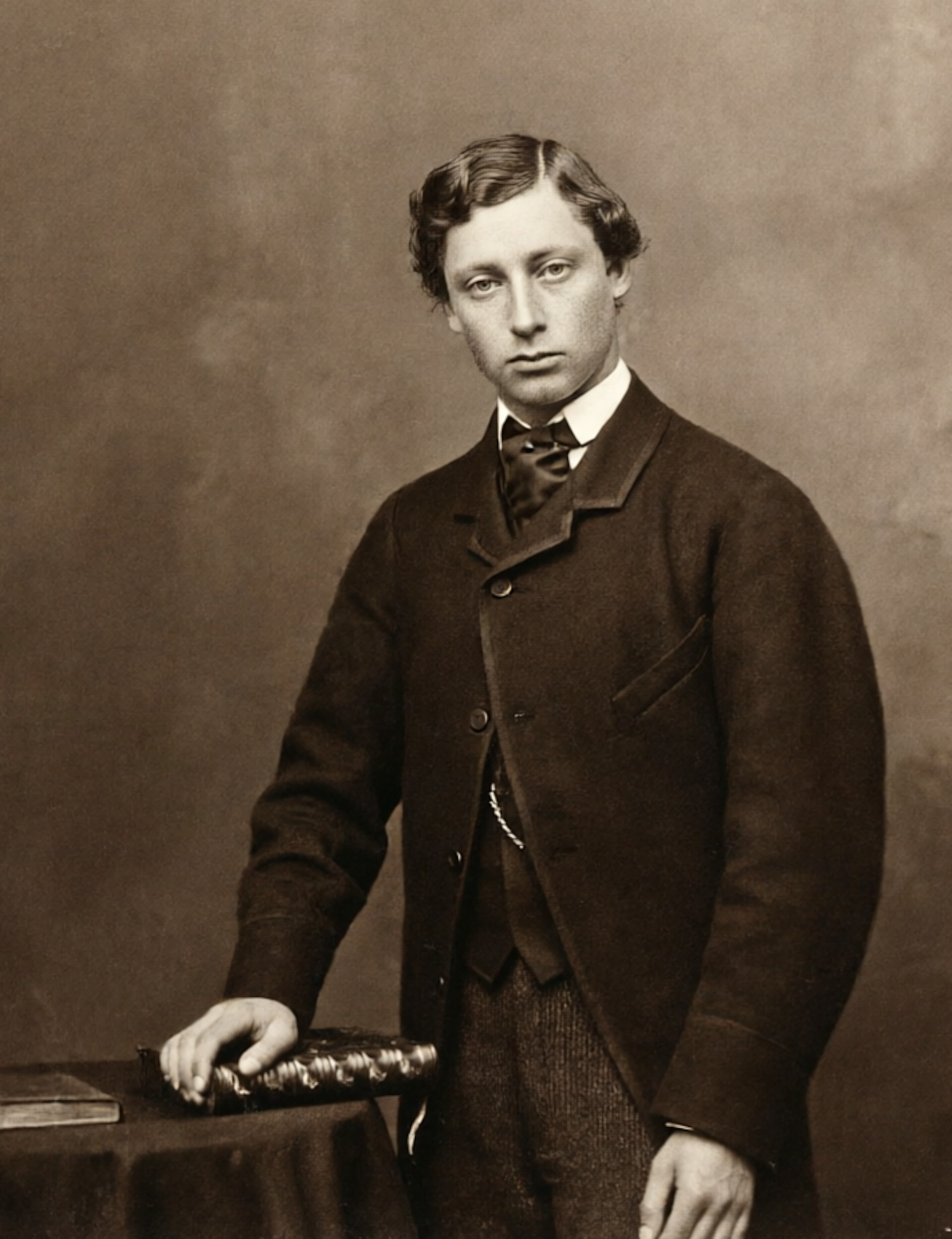
Edward in 1862

In 1860, Edward undertook the first tour of North America by a Prince of Wales. His genial good humour and confident bonhomie made the tour a great success. He inaugurated the Victoria Bridge, Montreal, across the St Lawrence River, and laid the cornerstone of Parliament Hill, Ottawa. He watched Charles Blondin traverse Niagara Falls by highwire, and stayed for three days with President James Buchanan at the White House. Buchanan accompanied the prince to Mount Vernon, to pay his respects at the tomb of George Washington. Vast crowds greeted Edward everywhere. He met Henry Wadsworth Longfellow, Ralph Waldo Emerson and Oliver Wendell Holmes Sr. Prayers for the royal family were said in Trinity Church, New York, for the first time since 1776. The four-month tour throughout Canada and the United States considerably boosted Edward's confidence and self-esteem, and had many diplomatic benefits for Great Britain.

Edward had hoped to pursue a career in the British Army, but his mother vetoed an active military career. He had been gazetted colonel on 9 November 1858 – to his disappointment, as he had wanted to earn his commission by examination. In September 1861, he was sent to Germany, supposedly to watch military manoeuvres, but actually in order to engineer a meeting between him and Princess Alexandra of Denmark. The Queen and Prince Albert had already decided that Edward and Alexandra should marry. They met at Speyer on 24 September under the auspices of Edward's elder sister, Victoria, who had married the Crown Prince of Prussia in 1858. Princess Victoria, acting upon instructions from her mother, had met Alexandra at Strelitz in June; Alexandra made a very favourable impression. She and Edward were friendly from the start, and marriage plans advanced.

Edward gained a reputation as a playboy. Determined to get some army experience, he attended manoeuvres in Ireland, during which he spent three nights with an actress, Nellie Clifden, who was hidden in the camp by his fellow officers. Albert, though ill, was appalled and visited Edward at Cambridge to issue a reprimand. Albert died in December 1861, just two weeks after the visit. The Queen was inconsolable, wore mourning clothes for the rest of her life and blamed Edward for his father's death. At first, she regarded her son with distaste as frivolous, indiscreet and irresponsible. She wrote to her eldest daughter, "I never can, or shall, look at him without a shudder."

=== Marriage ===
Once widowed, the Queen effectively withdrew from public life. Shortly after Prince Albert's death, she arranged for Edward to embark on an extensive tour of the Middle East, visiting Egypt, Jerusalem, Damascus, Beirut and Istanbul. The British government wanted Edward to secure the friendship of Egypt's ruler, Said Pasha, to prevent French control of the Suez Canal if the Ottoman Empire collapsed. It was the first royal tour on which an official photographer, Francis Bedford, was in attendance.

As soon as Edward returned to Britain, preparations were made for his engagement, which was sealed at Laeken in Belgium on 9 September 1862. Edward married Alexandra at St George's Chapel, Windsor Castle, on 10 March 1863. He was 21; she was 18.

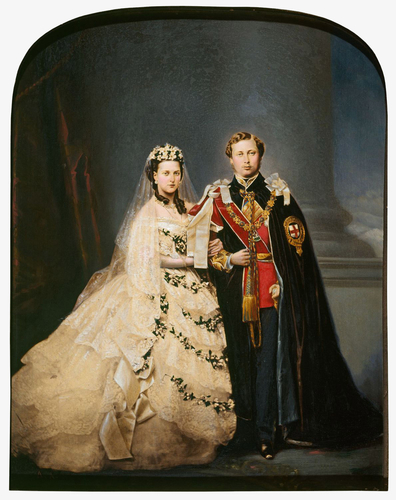
Edward and Alexandra on their wedding day, 1863

The couple established Marlborough House as their London residence and Sandringham House in Norfolk as their country retreat. They entertained on a lavish scale. Their marriage met with disapproval in certain circles because most of the Queen's relations were German, and Denmark was at loggerheads with Germany over the territories of Schleswig and Holstein. When Alexandra's father, King Christian IX, inherited the throne of Denmark in November 1863, the German Confederation took the opportunity to invade and annex Schleswig-Holstein. The Queen was of two minds as to whether it was a suitable match, given the political climate. After the marriage, she expressed anxiety about their socialite lifestyle and attempted to dictate to them on various matters, including the names of their children.

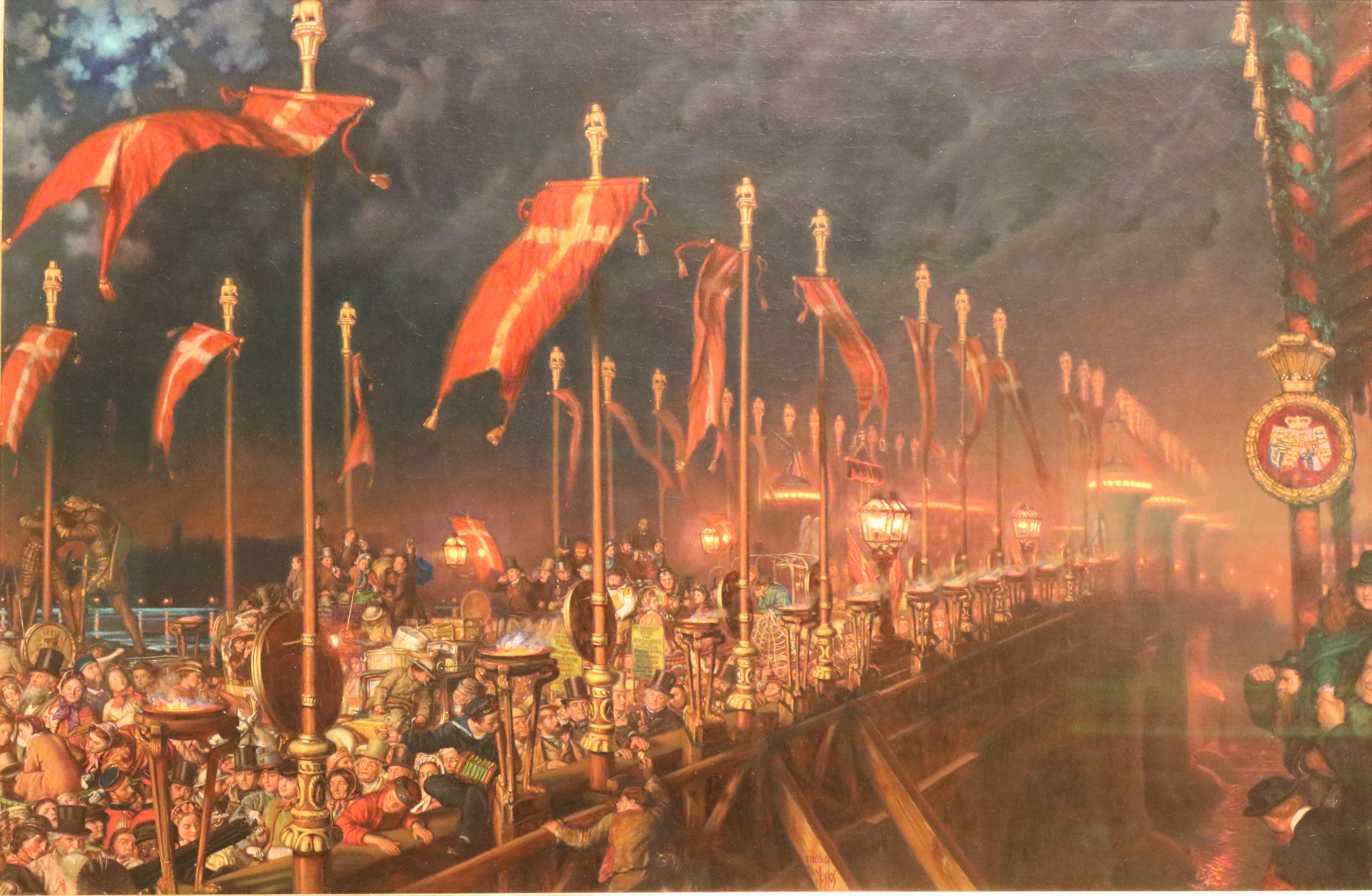
London Bridge on the Night of the Marriage of the Prince and Princess of Wales, by William Holman Hunt (1864)

Edward had mistresses throughout his married life. He socialised with actress Lillie Langtry; Lady Randolph Churchill; (Note: Letters written by Edward to Lady Randolph may have "signified no more than a flirtation" but were "[w]ritten in a strain of undue familiarity".) Daisy Greville, Countess of Warwick; actress Sarah Bernhardt; noblewoman Lady Susan Vane-Tempest; singer Hortense Schneider; prostitute Giulia Beneni (known as "La Barucci"); wealthy humanitarian Agnes Keyser; and Alice Keppel. At least fifty-five liaisons are conjectured. How far these relationships went is not always clear. Edward always strove to be discreet, but this did not prevent society gossip or press speculation. Keppel's great-granddaughter Camilla Parker Bowles became the mistress and subsequent wife of King Charles III, Edward's great-great-grandson. It was rumoured that Camilla's grandmother Sonia Keppel was fathered by Edward, but she was "almost certainly" the daughter of George Keppel, whom she resembled. Edward never acknowledged any illegitimate children. Alexandra was aware of his affairs, and seems to have accepted them.

In 1869, Sir Charles Mordaunt, a British Member of Parliament, threatened to name Edward as co-respondent in his divorce suit. Ultimately, he did not do so but Edward was called as a witness in the case in early 1870. It was shown that Edward had visited the Mordaunts' house while Sir Charles was away sitting in the House of Commons. Although nothing further was proven and Edward denied he had committed adultery, the suggestion of impropriety was damaging.

== Heir apparent ==
During his mother's widowhood, Edward pioneered the idea of royal public appearances as they are understood today – for example, opening the Thames Embankment in 1871, the Mersey Railway Tunnel in 1886, and Tower Bridge in 1894 – but his mother did not allow him an active role in the running of the country until 1898. He was sent summaries of important government documents, but she refused to give him access to the originals. Edward annoyed his mother, who favoured the Germans, by siding with Denmark on the Schleswig-Holstein Question in 1864 and in the same year annoyed her again by making a special effort to meet Giuseppe Garibaldi, the Italian general and revolutionary, who was a leader in the movement for Italian unification. Liberal Prime Minister William Ewart Gladstone sent him papers secretly. From 1886, Foreign Secretary Lord Rosebery sent him Foreign Office despatches, and from 1892 some Cabinet papers were opened to him.

In 1870 republican sentiment in Britain was given a boost when the French Emperor, Napoleon III, was defeated in the Franco-Prussian War and the French Third Republic was declared. However, in the winter of 1871, a brush with death led to an improvement in both Edward's popularity with the public and his relationship with his mother. While staying at Londesborough Lodge, near Scarborough, North Yorkshire, Edward contracted typhoid fever, the disease that was believed to have killed his father. There was great national concern, and one of his fellow guests (Lord Chesterfield) died. Edward's recovery was greeted with almost universal relief. Public celebrations included the composition of Arthur Sullivan's Festival Te Deum. Edward cultivated politicians from all parties, including republicans, as his friends, and thereby largely dissipated any residual feelings against him.

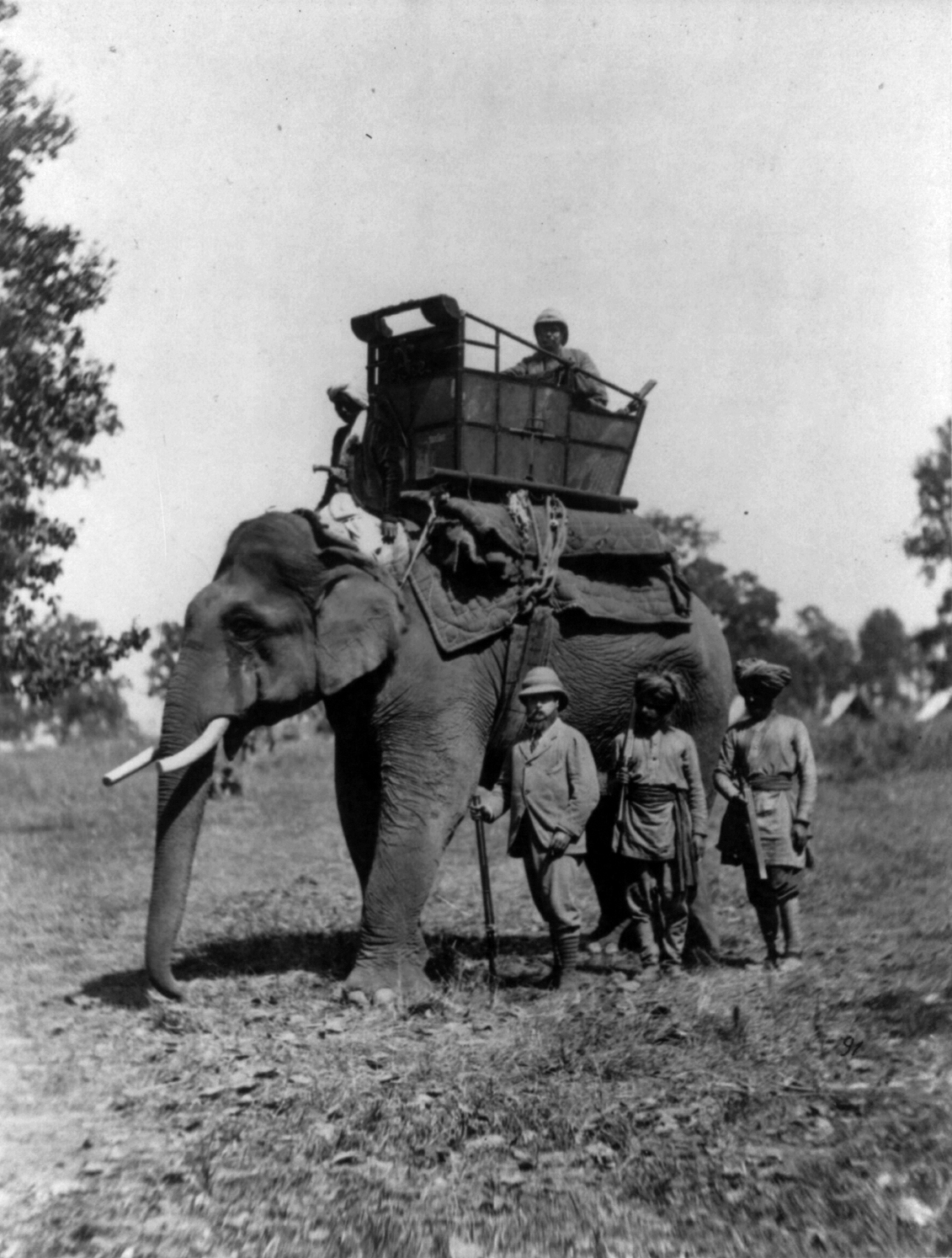
Edward (front left) in India, 1875–76

On 26 September 1875, Edward set off for India on an extensive eight-month tour; on the way, he visited Malta, Brindisi and Greece. His advisors remarked on his habit of treating all people the same, regardless of their social station or colour. In letters home, he complained of the treatment of the native Indians by the British officials and of the racial slurs they used: "Because a man has a black face and a different religion from our own, there is no reason why he should be treated as a brute." Consequently, Lord Salisbury, the Secretary of State for India, issued new guidance and at least one resident was removed from office. He returned to England on 11 May 1876, after stopping off at Portugal. At the end of the tour, Queen Victoria was given the title Empress of India by Parliament, in part as a result of the tour's success.

Edward was regarded worldwide as an arbiter of men's fashions. He made wearing tweed, Homburg hats and Norfolk jackets fashionable, and popularised the wearing of black ties with dinner jackets, instead of white tie and tails. He pioneered the pressing of trouser legs from side to side in preference to the now normal front and back creases, and was thought to have introduced the stand-up turn-down shirt collar, created for him by Charvet. A stickler for proper dress, he is said to have admonished Lord Salisbury for wearing the trousers of an Elder Brother of Trinity House with a privy councillor's coat. Deep in an international crisis, Salisbury informed Edward that it had been a dark morning, and that "my mind must have been occupied by some subject of less importance". The tradition of men not buttoning the bottom button of waistcoats is said to be linked to Edward, who supposedly left his undone because of his large girth. His waist measured 48 inches (122 cm) shortly before his coronation. He introduced the practice of eating roast beef and potatoes with horseradish sauce and Yorkshire pudding on Sundays, a meal that remains a staple British favourite for Sunday lunch. He was a lifelong heavy smoker, but not a heavy drinker, though he did drink champagne and, occasionally, port.

Edward was a patron of the arts and sciences and helped found the Royal College of Music. He opened the college in 1883 with the words, "Class can no longer stand apart from class ... I claim for music that it produces that union of feeling which I much desire to promote." At the same time, he enjoyed gambling and country sports, and was an enthusiastic hunter. He ordered all the clocks at Sandringham to run half an hour ahead to provide more daylight time for shooting. This tradition of so-called Sandringham time continued until 1936, when it was abolished by Edward VIII. He also laid out a golf course at Windsor. By the 1870s Edward had taken a keen interest in horseracing and steeplechasing. In 1896, his horse Persimmon won both the Derby and the St Leger. In 1900, Persimmon's brother, Diamond Jubilee, won five races, including the Triple Crown of Derby, St Leger and 2000 Guineas, as well as the Newmarket Stakes and Eclipse Stakes. The same year, another of Edward's horses, Ambush II, won the Grand National.

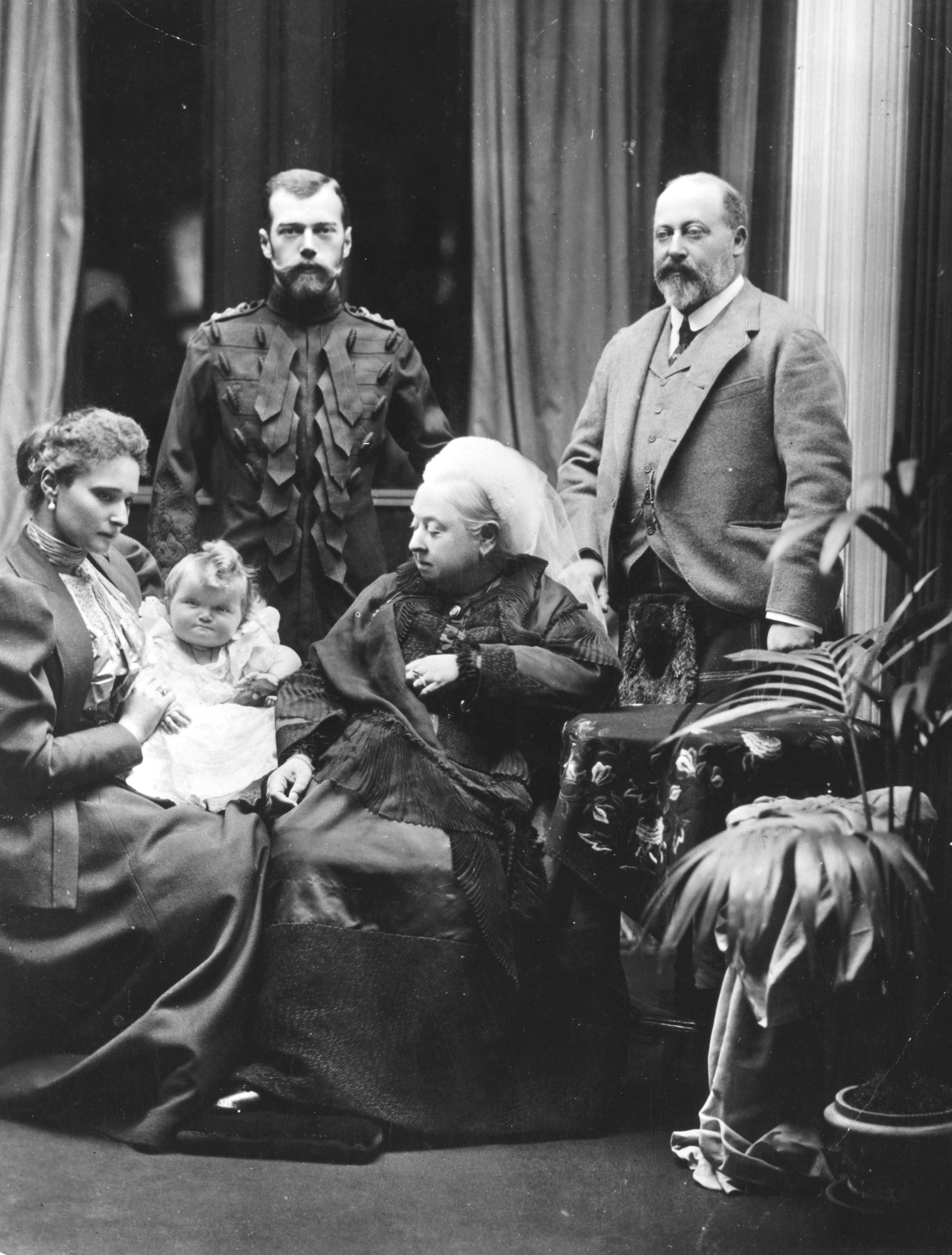
Edward (right) with his mother (centre); his niece Empress Alexandra of Russia (far left); her husband, Tsar Nicholas II; and their daughter Olga, 1896

In 1891 Edward was embroiled in the royal baccarat scandal, when it was revealed he had played an illegal card game for money the previous year. He was forced to appear as a witness in court for a second time when one of the participants unsuccessfully sued his fellow players for slander after being accused of cheating. In the same year Edward was involved in a personal conflict, when Lord Charles Beresford threatened to reveal details of Edward's private life to the press, as a protest against Edward interfering with Beresford's affair with Daisy Greville, Countess of Warwick. The friendship between the two men was irreversibly damaged, and their bitterness would last for the remainder of their lives. Usually, Edward's outbursts of temper were short-lived, and "after he had let himself go ... [he would] smooth matters by being especially nice".

In late 1891, Edward's eldest son, Albert Victor, was engaged to Princess Victoria Mary of Teck. Just a few weeks later, in early 1892, Albert Victor died of pneumonia. Edward was grief-stricken. "To lose our eldest son", he wrote, "is one of those calamities one can never really get over". Edward told the Queen, "[I would] have given my life for him, as I put no value on mine". Albert Victor was the second of Edward's children to die. In 1871, his youngest son, Alexander John, had died just 24 hours after being born. Edward had insisted on placing Alexander John in a coffin personally with "the tears rolling down his cheeks".

On his way to Denmark through Belgium on 4 April 1900, Edward was the victim of an attempted assassination when 15-year-old Jean-Baptiste Sipido shot at him in protest over the Second Boer War. The culprit was acquitted by a Belgian court because he was underage. The perceived laxity of the Belgian authorities, combined with British disgust at Belgian atrocities in the Congo, worsened the already poor relations between the United Kingdom and the Continent. However, in the next ten years, Edward's affability and popularity, as well as his use of family connections, assisted Britain in building European alliances.

== Reign ==
=== Accession ===
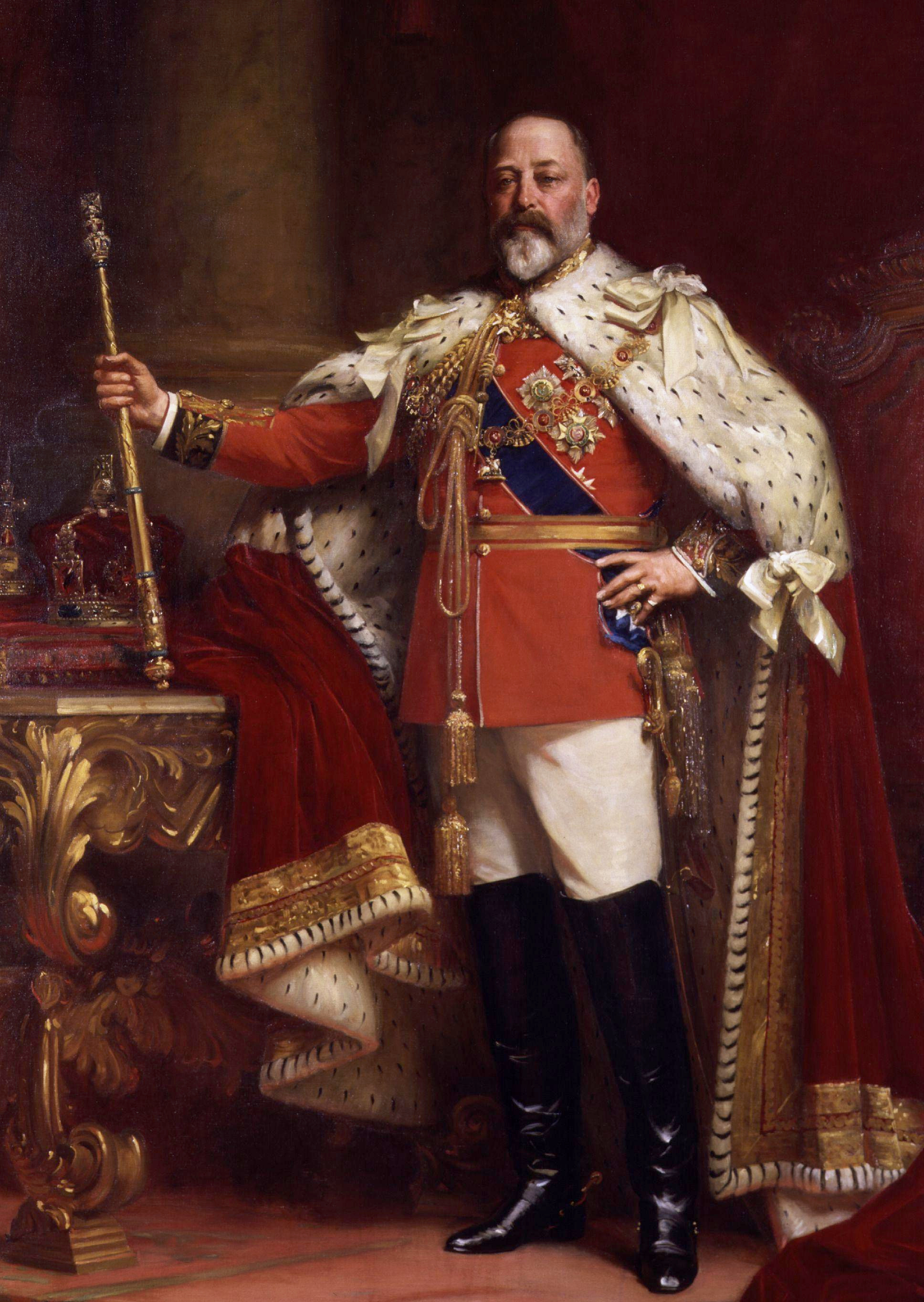
Portrait by Sir Luke Fildes, 1901

When his mother died on 22 January 1901, Edward became King of the United Kingdom, Emperor of India and, in an innovation, King of the British Dominions. He chose to reign under the name of Edward VII, instead of Albert Edward – the name his mother had intended for him to use (Note: No English or British sovereign has ever reigned under a double name.) – declaring that he did not wish to "undervalue the name of Albert" and diminish the status of his father with whom the "name should stand alone". The numeral VII was occasionally omitted in Scotland, even by the national church, in deference to protests that the previous Edwards were English kings who had "been excluded from Scotland by battle". J. B. Priestley recalled, "I was only a child when he succeeded Victoria in 1901, but I can testify to his extraordinary popularity. He was in fact the most popular king England had known since the earlier 1660s."

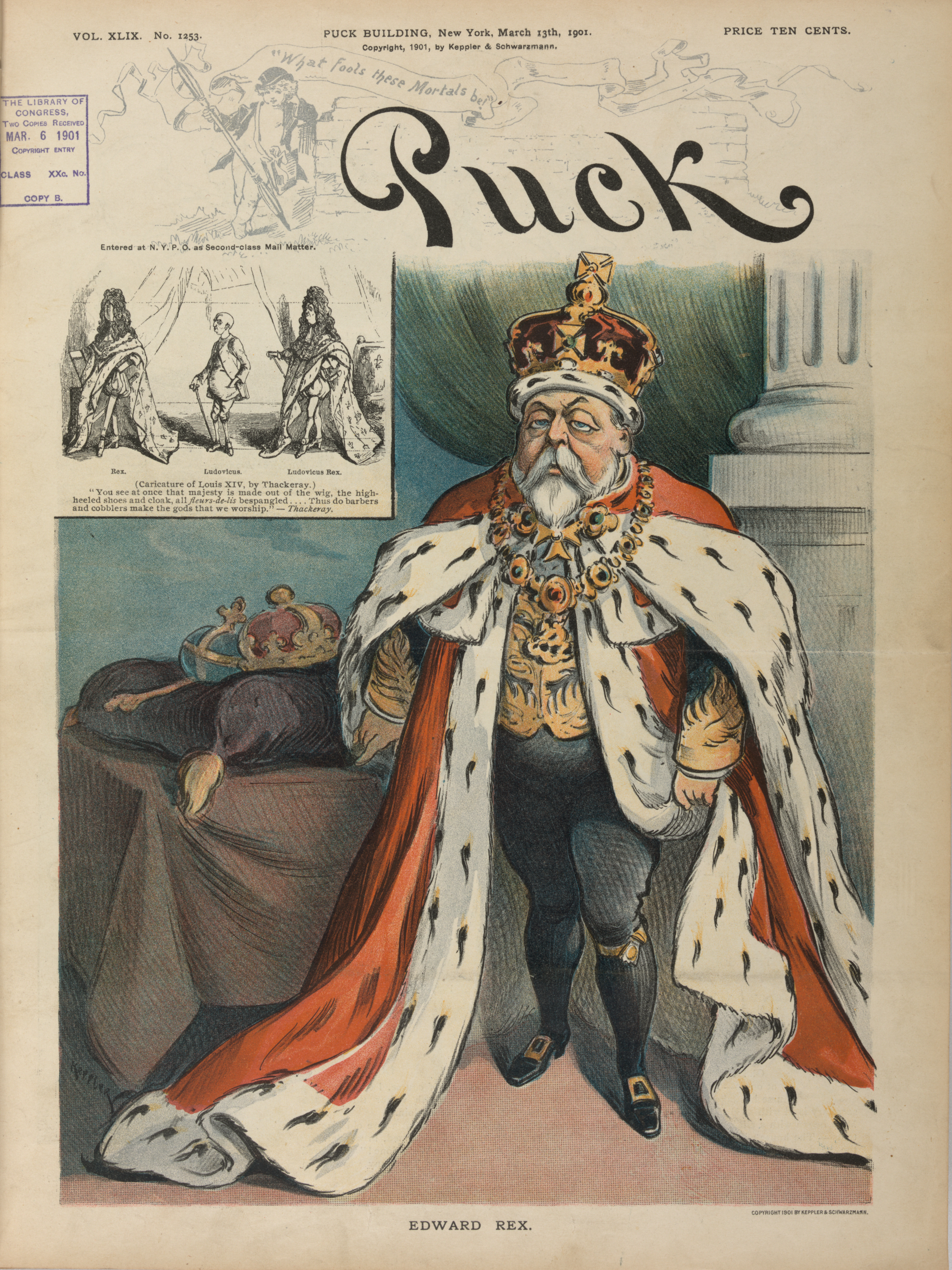
Caricature in Puck magazine, 1901

Edward donated his parents' house, Osborne on the Isle of Wight, to the state and continued to live at Sandringham. He could afford to be magnanimous; his private secretary, Sir Francis Knollys, claimed that he was the first heir to succeed to the throne in credit. Edward's finances had been ably managed by Sir Dighton Probyn, Comptroller of the Household, and had benefited from advice from Edward's financier friends, some of whom were Jewish, such as Ernest Cassel, Maurice de Hirsch and the Rothschild family. At a time of widespread antisemitism, Edward attracted criticism for openly socialising with Jews.

Edward's coronation had originally been scheduled for 26 June 1902. However, two days before, he was diagnosed with appendicitis. The disease was generally not treated operatively. It carried a high mortality rate, but developments in anaesthesia and antisepsis in the preceding 50 years made life-saving surgery possible. Sir Frederick Treves, with the support of Lord Lister, performed a then-radical operation of draining a pint of pus from the infected abscess through an incision in the King's abdomen; this outcome showed that the cause was not cancer. The next day, Edward was sitting up in bed, smoking a cigar. Two weeks later, it was announced that he was out of danger. Treves was honoured with a baronetcy (which the King had arranged before the operation) and appendix surgery entered the medical mainstream. Edward was crowned at Westminster Abbey on 9 August 1902 by the Archbishop of Canterbury, Frederick Temple.

Edward refurbished the royal palaces, reintroduced the traditional ceremonies, such as the State Opening of Parliament, that his mother had foregone, and founded new honours, such as the Order of Merit, to recognise contributions to the arts and sciences.

Mozaffar ad-Din Shah (middle) on the Royal Yacht with Edward VII and Queen Alexandra, 1902

In 1902, the Shah of Persia, Mozaffar ad-Din Shah, visited England expecting to receive the Order of the Garter. The King refused to bestow the honour on the Shah because the order was meant to be in his personal gift and the Foreign Secretary, Lord Lansdowne, had promised it without his consent. He also objected to inducting a Muslim into a Christian order of chivalry. His refusal threatened to damage British attempts to gain influence in Persia, but Edward resented his ministers' attempts to reduce his traditional powers. Eventually, he relented and Britain sent a special embassy to the Shah with a full Order of the Garter the following year.

=== "Uncle of Europe" ===
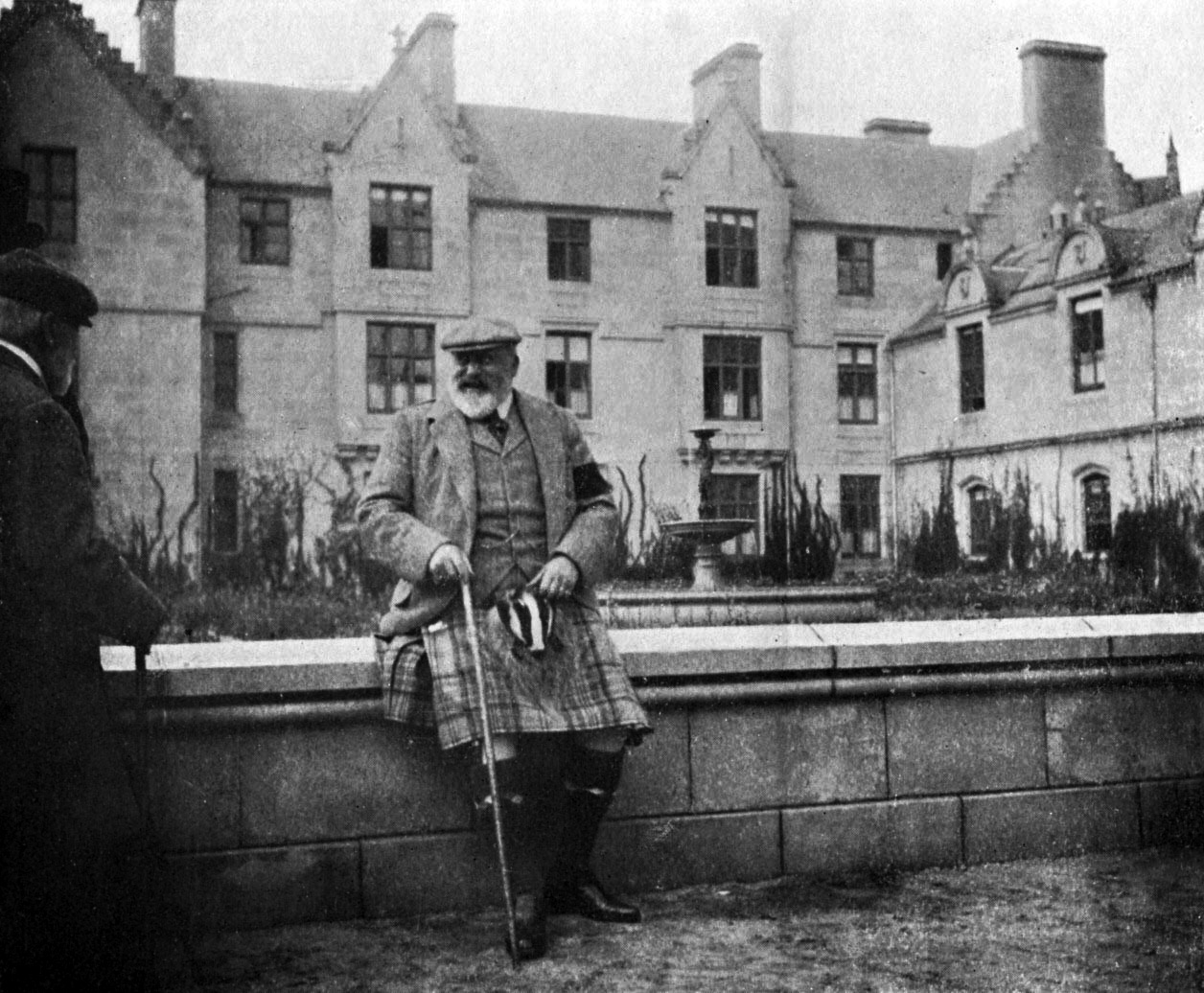
Relaxing at Balmoral Castle, photograph by Queen Alexandra

As King, Edward's main interests lay in the fields of foreign affairs and naval and military matters. Fluent in French and German, he reinvented royal diplomacy by numerous state visits across Europe. He took annual holidays in Biarritz and Marienbad. One of his most important foreign trips was an official visit to France in May 1903 as the guest of President Émile Loubet. Following a visit to Pope Leo XIII in Rome, this trip helped create the atmosphere for the Anglo-French Entente Cordiale, an agreement delineating British and French colonies in North Africa, and ruling out any future war between the two countries. The Entente was negotiated in 1904 between the French foreign minister, Théophile Delcassé, and the British foreign secretary, Lord Lansdowne. It marked the end of centuries of Anglo-French rivalry and Britain's splendid isolation from Continental affairs, and attempted to counterbalance the growing dominance of the German Empire and its ally, Austria-Hungary.

Edward was related to nearly every other European monarch, and came to be known as the "uncle of Europe". German Emperor Wilhelm II and Emperor Nicholas II of Russia were his nephews, the former by blood and the latter through marriage; Queen Victoria Eugenia of Spain, Crown Princess Margaret of Sweden, Crown Princess Marie of Romania, Crown Princess Sophia of Greece, and Empress Alexandra of Russia were his nieces; King Haakon VII of Norway was both his nephew and his son-in-law; kings Frederick VIII of Denmark and George I of Greece were his brothers-in-law; kings Albert I of Belgium, Ferdinand I of Bulgaria, and Carlos I and Manuel II of Portugal were his second cousins. Edward doted on his grandchildren, and indulged them, to the consternation of their governesses. However, there was one relation whom Edward did not like: Wilhelm II. His difficult relationship with his nephew exacerbated the tensions between Germany and Britain.

In April 1908, during Edward's annual stay at Biarritz, he accepted the resignation of British Prime Minister Sir Henry Campbell-Bannerman. In a break with precedent, Edward asked Campbell-Bannerman's successor, H. H. Asquith, to travel to Biarritz to kiss hands. Asquith complied, but the press criticised the action of the King in appointing a prime minister on foreign soil instead of returning to Britain. In June 1908, Edward became the first reigning British monarch to visit the Russian Empire, despite refusing to visit in 1906, when Anglo-Russian relations were strained in the aftermath of the Russo-Japanese War, the Dogger Bank incident, and the Tsar's dissolution of the Duma. The previous month, he visited the Scandinavian countries, becoming the first British monarch to visit Sweden.

=== Political opinions ===
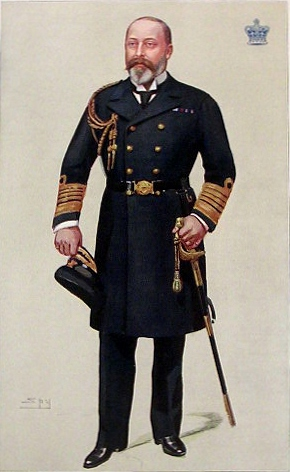
Portrait in naval uniform by Vanity Fair magazine, 1902

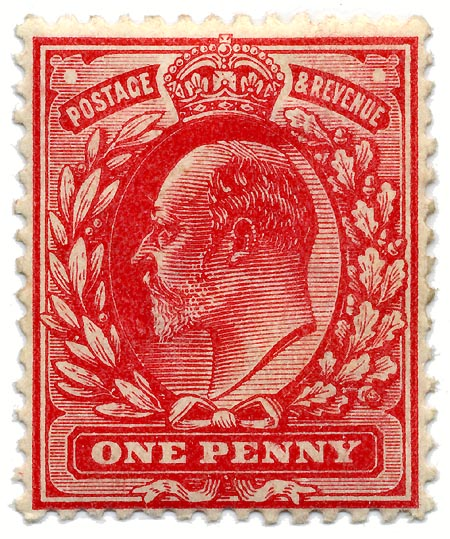
Edward VII on British 1-penny stamp of 1902

While Prince of Wales, Edward had to be dissuaded from breaking with constitutional precedent by openly voting for W. E. Gladstone's Representation of the People Bill (1884) in the House of Lords. On other matters, he was more conservative; for example, he did not favour giving votes to women, although he did suggest that the social reformer Octavia Hill serve on the Commission for Working Class Housing. He was also opposed to Irish Home Rule, instead preferring a form of dual monarchy.

As Prince of Wales, Edward had come to enjoy warm and mutually respectful relations with Gladstone, whom his mother detested, but the statesman's son, Home Secretary Herbert Gladstone, angered the King by planning to permit Roman Catholic priests in vestments to carry the Host through the streets of London, and by appointing two ladies, Lady Frances Balfour and May Tennant (wife of H. J. Tennant), to serve on a Royal Commission on reforming divorce law – Edward thought divorce could not be discussed with "delicacy or even decency" before ladies. Edward's biographer Philip Magnus suggests that Gladstone may have become a whipping boy for the King's general irritation with the Liberal government. Gladstone was sacked in the reshuffle the following year and the King agreed, with some reluctance, to appoint him Governor-General of South Africa.

Edward involved himself heavily in discussions over army reform, the need for which had become apparent with the failings of the Second Boer War. He supported the redesign of army command, the creation of the Territorial Force, and the decision to provide an Expeditionary Force supporting France in the event of war with Germany. Reform of the Royal Navy was also suggested, partly due to the ever-increasing Naval Estimates, and because of the emergence of the Imperial German Navy as a new strategic threat. Ultimately a dispute arose between Admiral Lord Charles Beresford, who favoured increased spending and a broad deployment, and the First Sea Lord Admiral Sir John Fisher, who favoured efficiency savings, scrapping obsolete vessels, and a strategic realignment of the Royal Navy relying on torpedo craft for home defence backed by the new dreadnoughts.

The King lent support to Fisher, in part because he disliked Beresford, and eventually Beresford was dismissed. Beresford continued his campaign outside of the navy and Fisher ultimately announced his resignation in late 1909, although the bulk of his policies were retained. The King was intimately involved in the appointment of Fisher's successor as the Fisher-Beresford feud had split the service, and the only truly qualified figure known to be outside of both camps was Sir Arthur Wilson, who had retired in 1907. Wilson was reluctant to return to active duty, but Edward persuaded him to do so, and Wilson became First Sea Lord on 25 January 1910.

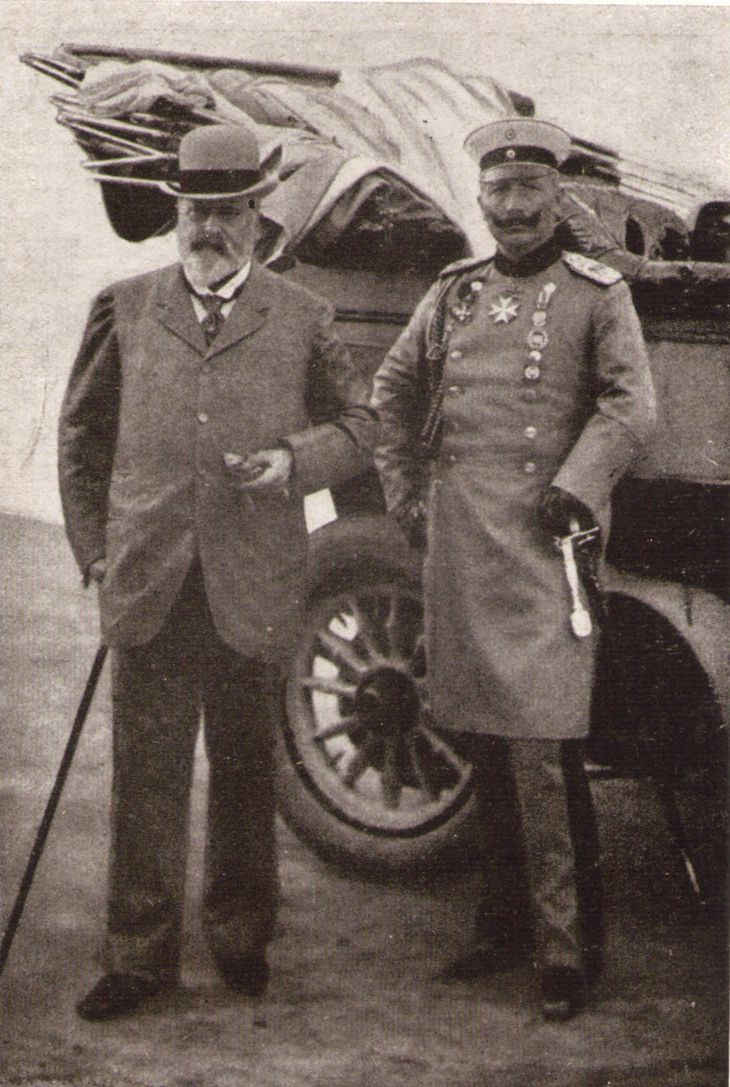
Edward VII (left) and Kaiser Wilhelm II (right)

Edward was rarely interested in politics, although his views on some issues were notably progressive for the time. During his reign, he said use of the word nigger was "disgraceful", despite it then being in common parlance. In 1904, Wilhelm II and Edward met during an Anglo-German summit in Kiel. Wilhelm, with the Russo-Japanese War in mind, started to go on about the "Yellow Peril", which he called "the greatest peril menacing ... Christendom and European civilisation. If the Russians went on giving ground, the yellow race would, in twenty years time, be in Moscow and Posen". Wilhelm went on to attack his British guests for supporting Japan against Russia, suggesting that the British were committing "race treason". In response, Edward stated that he "could not see it. The Japanese were an intelligent, brave and chivalrous nation, quite as civilised as the Europeans, from whom they only differed by the pigmentation of their skin". Although Edward lived a life of luxury often far removed from that of the majority of his subjects, they expected it, and his personal charm with all levels of society and his strong condemnation of prejudice went some way to assuage republican and racial tensions building during his lifetime.

=== Constitutional crisis ===
In the last year of his life, Edward became embroiled in a constitutional crisis when the Conservative majority in the House of Lords refused to pass the "People's Budget" proposed by the Liberal government of Prime Minister Asquith. The crisis eventually led – after Edward's death – to the removal of the Lords' right to veto legislation. The King was displeased at Liberal attacks on the peers, which included a polemical speech by David Lloyd George at Limehouse. Cabinet minister Winston Churchill publicly demanded a general election, for which Asquith apologised to the King's adviser Lord Knollys and rebuked Churchill at a Cabinet meeting. Edward was so dispirited at the tone of class warfare – although Asquith told him that party rancour had been just as bad over the First Home Rule Bill in 1886 – that he introduced his son to Secretary of State for War Richard Haldane as "the last King of England". After the King's horse Minoru won the Derby on 26 July 1909, he returned to the racetrack the following day and laughed when a man shouted: "Now, King. You've won the Derby. Go back home and dissolve this bloody Parliament!"

In vain, the King urged Conservative leaders Arthur Balfour and Lord Lansdowne to pass the budget, which Lord Esher had advised him was not unusual, as Queen Victoria had helped to broker agreements between the two Houses over Irish disestablishment in 1869 and the Third Reform Act in 1884. On Asquith's advice, however, he did not offer them an election (at which, to judge from recent by-elections, they were likely to gain seats) as a reward for doing so.

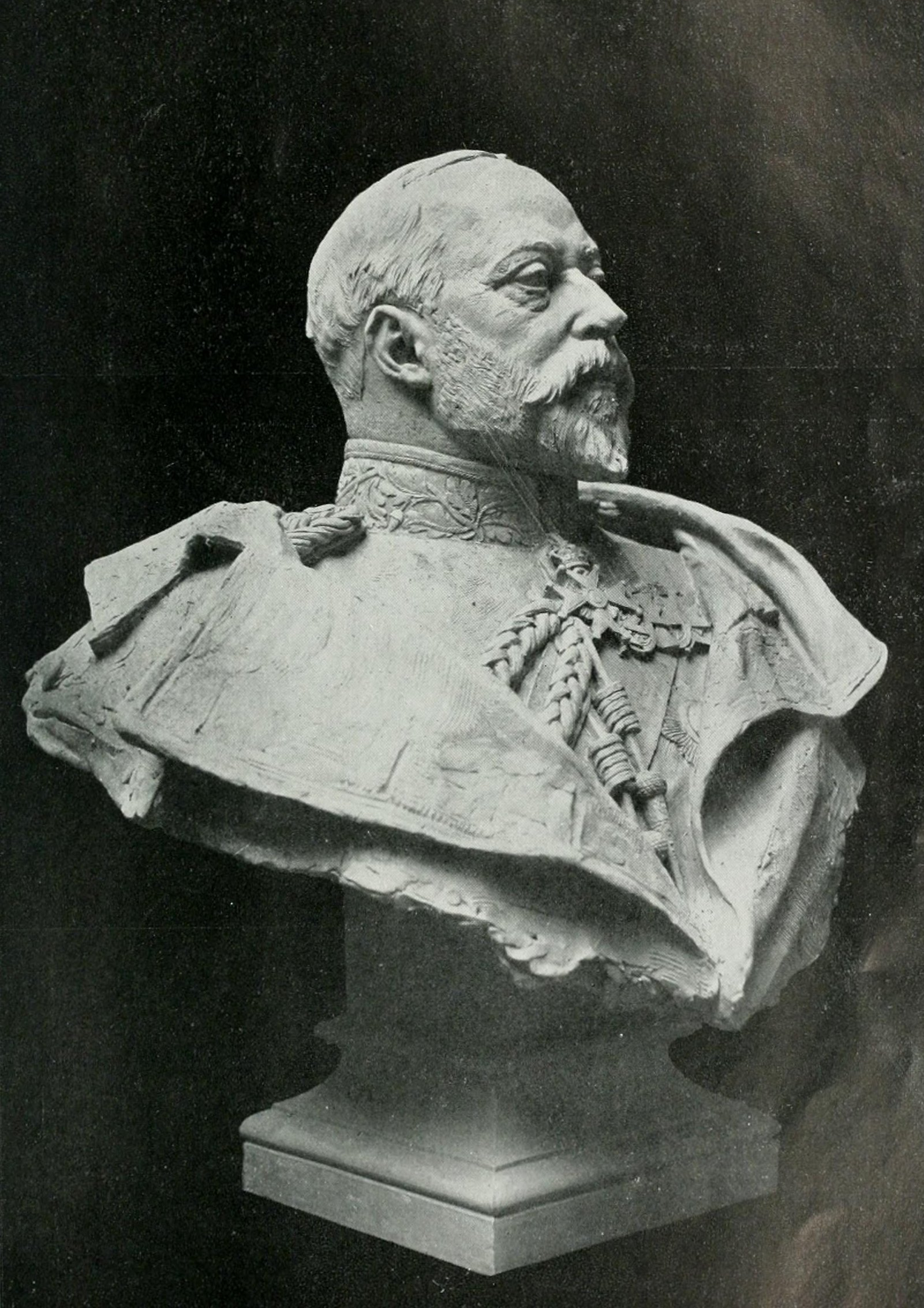
Bust by Francis Derwent Wood

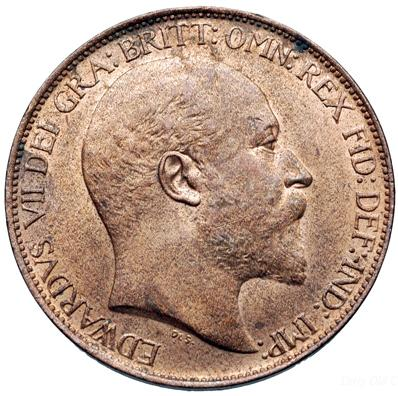
Profile of Edward VII on a halfpenny, 1902

The Finance Bill passed the Commons on 5 November 1909, but was rejected by the Lords on 30 November; they instead passed a resolution of Lord Lansdowne's stating that they were entitled to oppose the bill as it lacked an electoral mandate. The King was annoyed that his efforts to urge passage of the budget had become public knowledge and had forbidden Knollys, who was an active Liberal peer, from voting for the budget, although Knollys had suggested that this would be a suitable gesture to indicate royal desire to see the budget pass. In December 1909, a proposal to create peers (to give the Liberals a majority in the Lords) or give the prime minister the right to do so was considered "outrageous" by Knollys, who thought the King should abdicate rather than agree to it.

Talk of removing the Lords' veto played a major role in the January 1910 election. Early in the election campaign, Lloyd George talked of "guarantees" and Asquith of "safeguards" that would be necessary before forming another Liberal government, but such talk ceased after the King informed Asquith that he would not be willing to contemplate creating peers until after a second general election. Balfour refused to say whether or not he would be willing to form a Conservative government, but advised the King not to promise to create peers until he had seen the terms of any proposed constitutional change. During the campaign, the leading Conservative Walter Long asked Knollys for permission to state that the King did not favour Irish Home Rule, but Knollys refused on the grounds that it was not appropriate for the monarch's views to be known in public.

The election resulted in a hung parliament, with the Liberal government dependent on the support of the third-largest party, the nationalist Irish Parliamentary Party. The King suggested a compromise whereby only 50 peers from each side would be allowed to vote, which would also obviate the large Conservative majority in the Lords, but Lord Crewe, Liberal leader in the Lords, advised that this would reduce the Lords' independence, as only peers who were loyal party supporters would be picked. Pressure to remove the Lords' veto now came from the Irish nationalist MPs, who wanted to remove the Lords' ability to block the introduction of Home Rule. They threatened to vote against the budget unless they had their way (an attempt by Lloyd George to win their support by amending whiskey duties was abandoned as the Cabinet felt this would recast the budget too much). Asquith now revealed that there were no "guarantees" for the creation of peers. The Cabinet considered resigning and leaving it up to Balfour to try to form a Conservative government.

The King's speech from the throne on 21 February made reference to introducing measures restricting the Lords' power of veto to one of delay, but Asquith inserted a phrase "in the opinion of my advisers" so the King could be seen to be distancing himself from the planned legislation. The Commons passed resolutions on 14 April that would form the basis for the Parliament Act 1911: to remove the power of the Lords to veto money bills, to replace their veto of other bills with a power to delay, and to reduce the term of Parliament from seven years to five (the King would have preferred four). However, in that debate Asquith hinted – to ensure the support of the nationalist MPs – that he would ask the King to break the deadlock "in that Parliament" (i.e. contrary to Edward's earlier stipulation that there be a second election). The budget was passed by both Commons and Lords in April.

By April, the Palace was having secret talks with Balfour and Randall Davidson, Archbishop of Canterbury, who both advised that the Liberals did not have sufficient mandate to demand the creation of peers. The King thought the whole proposal "simply disgusting" and that the government was "in the hands of Redmond & Co". Lord Crewe announced publicly that the government's wish to create peers should be treated as formal "ministerial advice" (which, by convention, the monarch must accept), although Lord Esher argued that the monarch was entitled in extremis to dismiss the government rather than take their "advice". Esher's view has been called "obsolete and unhelpful".

== Death ==
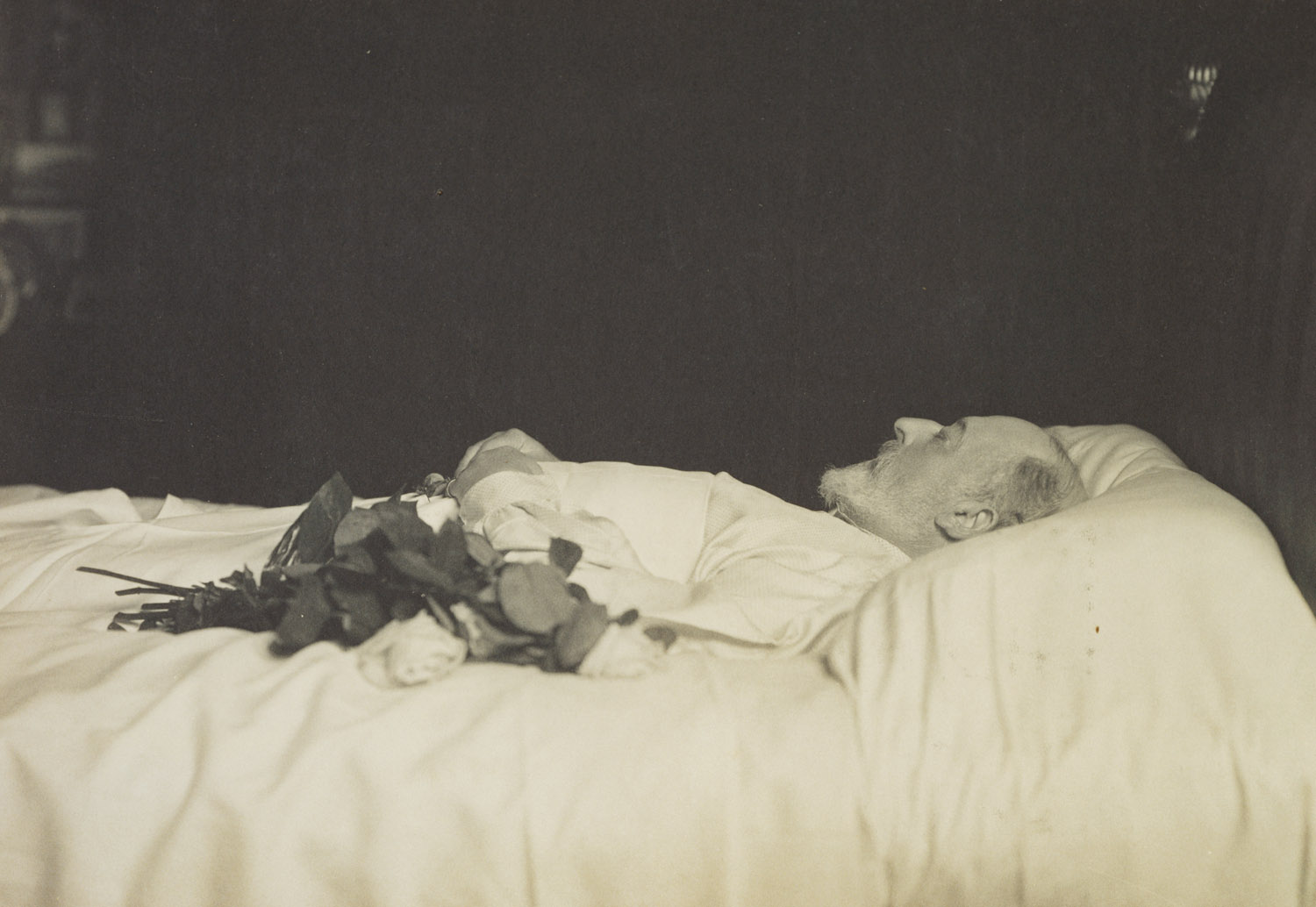
Deathbed photograph, May 1910

Funeral procession of Edward VII, London, 1910

Edward habitually smoked twenty cigarettes and twelve cigars a day. In 1907, a rodent ulcer, a type of cancer affecting the skin next to his nose, was cured with radium. Towards the end of his life he increasingly suffered from bronchitis. He suffered a momentary loss of consciousness during a state visit to Berlin in February 1909. In March 1910, he was staying at Biarritz when he collapsed. He remained there to convalesce, while in London Asquith tried to get the Finance Bill passed. The King's continued ill health was unreported, and he attracted criticism for staying in France while political tensions were so high. On 27 April he returned to Buckingham Palace, still suffering from severe bronchitis. Alexandra returned from visiting her brother, George I of Greece, in Corfu a week later on 5 May.

On 6 May, Edward suffered several heart attacks, but refused to go to bed, saying, "No, I shall not give in; I shall go on; I shall work to the end." Between moments of faintness, his son the Prince of Wales (shortly to be King George V) told him that his horse, Witch of the Air, had won at Kempton Park that afternoon. The King replied, "Yes, I have heard of it. I am very glad": his final words. At 11:30 pm he lost consciousness for the last time and was put to bed. He died 15 minutes later, aged 68.

Alexandra refused to allow Edward's body to be moved for eight days afterwards, though she allowed small groups of visitors to enter his room. On 11 May, the late king was dressed in his uniform and placed in a massive oak coffin, which was moved on 14 May to the throne room, where it was sealed and lay in state, with a guardsman standing at each corner of the bier. Despite the time that had elapsed since his death, Alexandra noted his body remained "wonderfully preserved". On the morning of 17 May, the coffin was placed on a gun carriage and drawn by black horses to Westminster Hall, with the new king, his family and Edward's favourite dog, Caesar, walking behind. Following a brief service, the royal family left, and the hall was opened to the public; over 400,000 people filed past the coffin over the next two days. As Barbara W. Tuchman noted in The Guns of August, his funeral, held on 20 May 1910, marked "the greatest assemblage of royalty and rank ever gathered in one place and, of its kind, the last". A royal train conveyed the King's coffin from London to Windsor Castle, where Edward was buried at St George's Chapel.

== Legacy ==
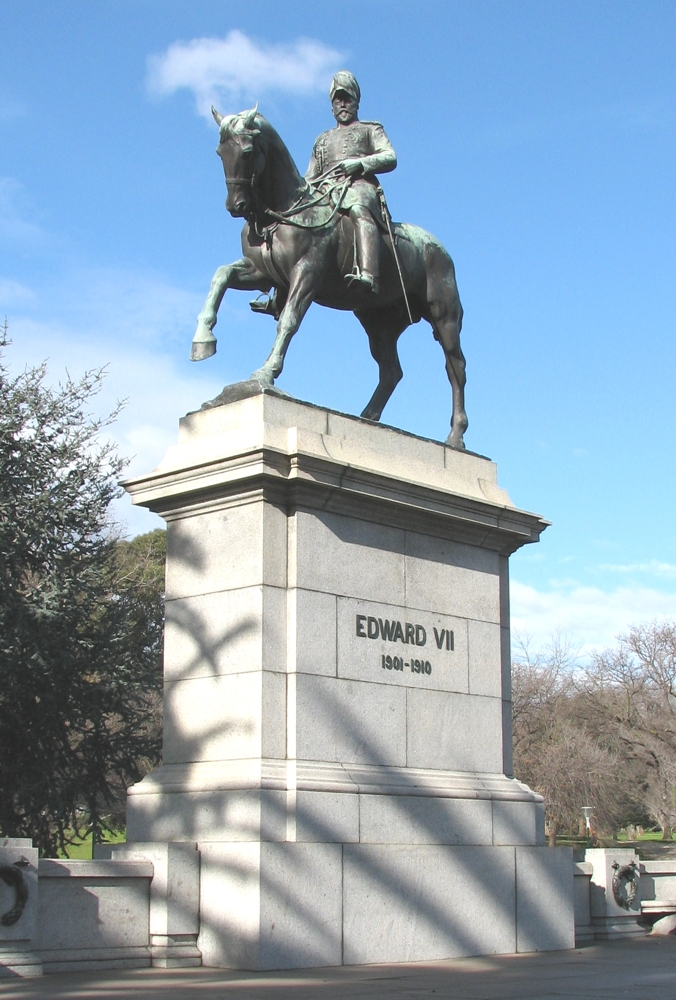
Statue in Queen Victoria Gardens, Melbourne

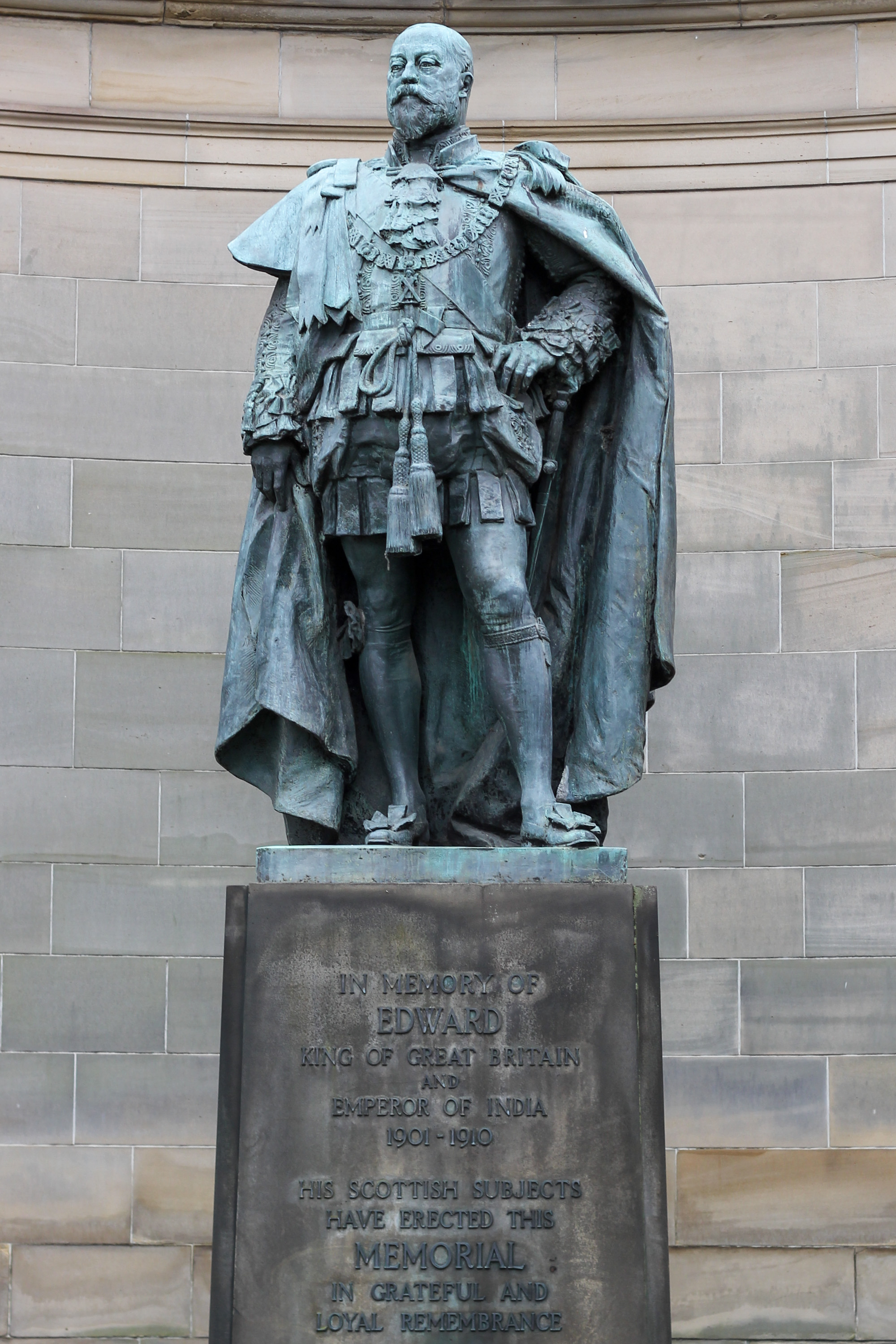
Statue outside Holyrood Palace, Edinburgh

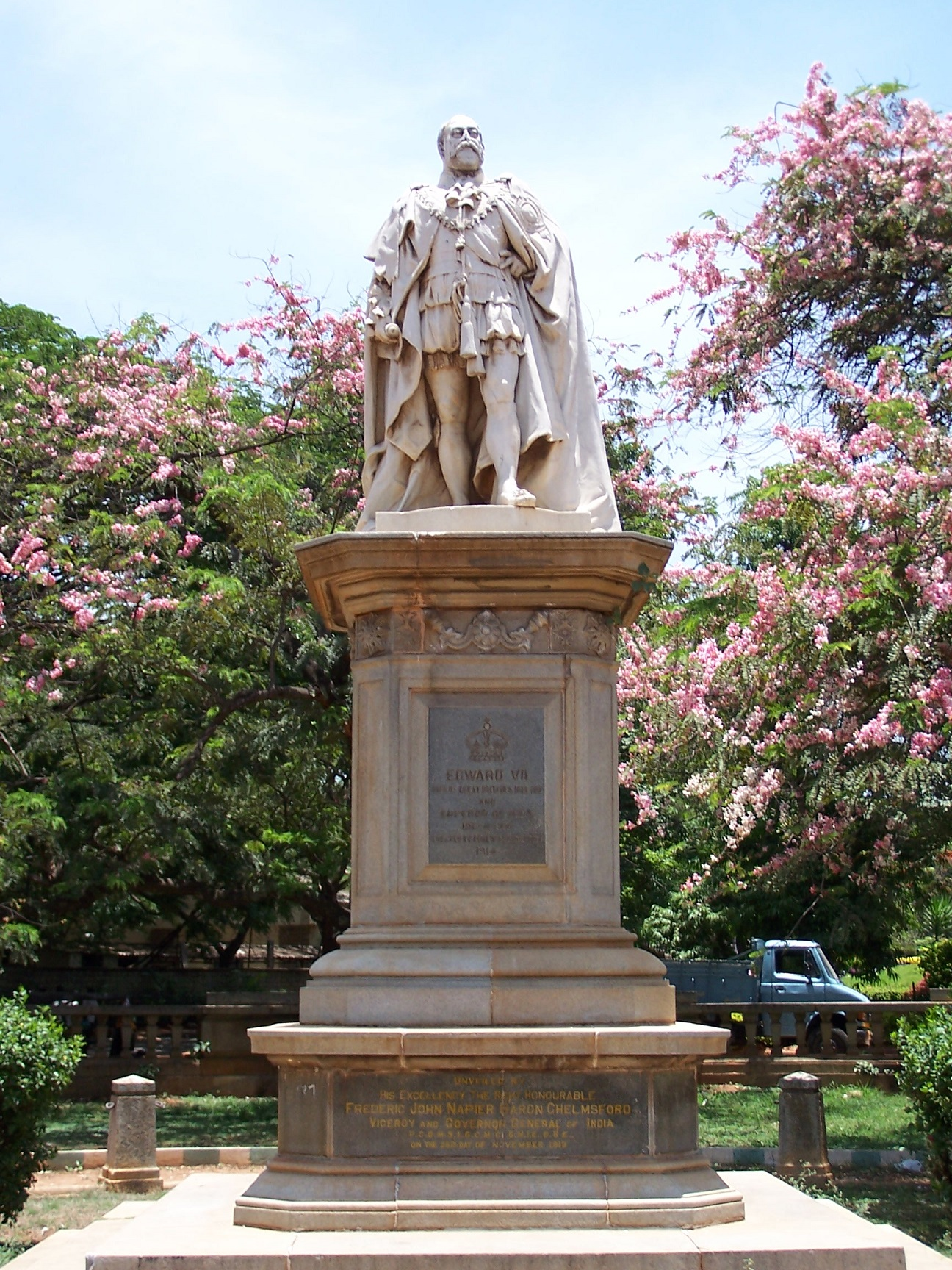
Statue of Edward VII, Bangalore, India

Statues of Edward can be found throughout the former empire.

Before his accession to the throne, Edward was the longest-serving heir apparent in British history. He was surpassed by his great-great-grandson Charles III on 20 April 2011. The title Prince of Wales is not automatically held by the heir apparent; it is bestowed by the reigning monarch at a time of their choosing. Edward was the longest-serving holder of that title until surpassed by Charles on 9 September 2017. Edward was Prince of Wales between 8 December 1841 and 22 January 1901 (59 years, 45 days); Charles held the title between 26 July 1958 and 8 September 2022 (64 years, 44 days).

As king, Edward VII proved a greater success than anyone had expected, but he was already past the average life expectancy and had little time left to fulfil the role. In his short reign, he ensured that his second son and heir, George V, was better prepared to take the throne. Contemporaries described their relationship as more like affectionate brothers than father and son, and on Edward's death George wrote in his diary that he had lost his "best friend and the best of fathers ... I never had a [cross] word with him in my life. I am heart-broken and overwhelmed with grief".

Edward has been recognised as the first truly constitutional British sovereign and the last sovereign to wield effective political power. Though lauded as "Peacemaker", he had been afraid that German Emperor Wilhelm II, who was one of his nephews, would tip Europe into war. Four years after Edward's death, the First World War broke out. The naval reforms he had supported and his part in securing the Triple Entente between Britain, France, and Russia, as well as his relationships with his extended family, fed the paranoia of the German Emperor, who blamed Edward for the war. Publication of the official biography of Edward was delayed until 1927 by its author, Sidney Lee, who feared German propagandists would select material to portray Edward as an anti-German warmonger. Lee was also hampered by the extensive destruction of Edward's personal papers; Edward had left orders that all his letters should be burned on his death. Subsequent biographers have been able to construct a more rounded picture of Edward by using material and sources that were unavailable to Lee.

Historian R. C. K. Ensor, writing in 1936, praised the King's political personality:

...he had in many respects great natural ability. He knew how to be both dignified and charming; he had an excellent memory; and his tact in handling people was quite exceptional. He had a store of varied, though unsystematised, knowledge gathered at first-hand through talking to all sorts of eminent men. His tastes were not particularly elevated, but they were thoroughly English; and he showed much (though not unfailing) comprehension for the common instincts of the people over whom he reigned. This was not the less remarkable because, though a good linguist in French and German, he never learned to speak English without a German accent.

Ensor rejects the widespread notion that the King exerted an important influence on British foreign policy, believing he gained that reputation by making frequent trips abroad, with many highly publicised visits to foreign courts. Ensor thought surviving documents showed "how comparatively crude his views on foreign policy were, how little he read, and of what naïve indiscretions he was capable". Edward received criticism for his apparent pursuit of self-indulgent pleasure, but he received great praise for his affable manners and diplomatic tact. As his grandson Edward VIII wrote, "his lighter side ... obscured the fact that he had both insight and influence". "He had a tremendous zest for pleasure but he also had a real sense of duty", wrote J. B. Priestley. Lord Esher wrote that Edward VII was "kind and debonair and not undignified – but too human".

== Titles, styles, honours, and arms ==
=== Titles and styles ===
As the eldest son of the British sovereign, Edward was automatically Duke of Cornwall and Duke of Rothesay at birth. As a son of Prince Albert, he also held the titles of Prince of Saxe-Coburg and Gotha and Duke of Saxony. He was created Prince of Wales and Earl of Chester on 8 December 1841, Earl of Dublin on 17 January 1850, (Note: Gazetted on 10 September 1849.) a Knight of the Garter on 9 November 1858, and a Knight of the Thistle on 24 May 1867. In 1863, he renounced his succession rights to the Duchy of Saxe-Coburg and Gotha in favour of his younger brother Alfred.

His full style as king was "Edward the Seventh, by the Grace of God, of the United Kingdom of Great Britain and Ireland, King, Defender of the Faith, Emperor of India".

=== Honours ===
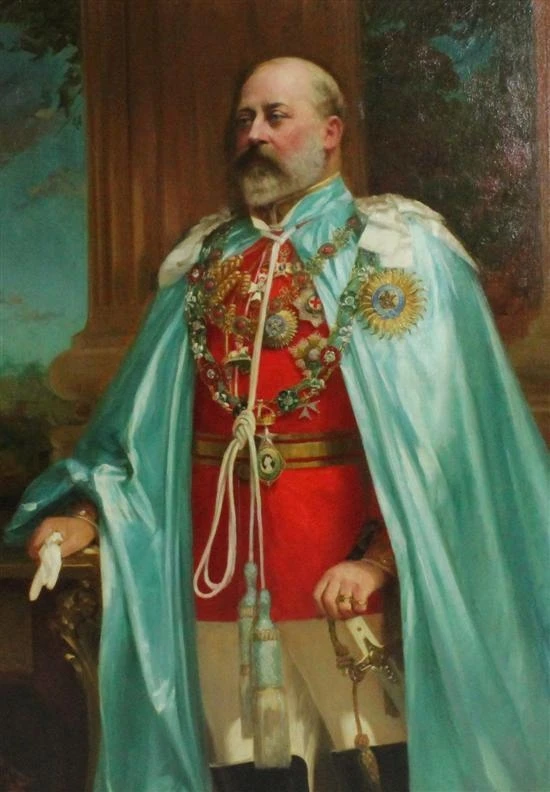
Edward VII wearing the Order of the Star of India. He became an extra knight of the order in 1861, while Prince of Wales. Portrait by Alfred James Downey.

British honours

- KG: Royal Knight Companion of the Garter, 9 November 1858
- GCSI: Extra Knight Companion of the Star of India, 25 June 1861; Extra Knight Grand Commander, 24 May 1866
- FRS: Fellow of the Royal Society, 12 February 1863
- PC: Member of the Privy Council of the United Kingdom, 8 December 1863
- GCB: Knight Grand Cross of the Bath (military), 10 February 1865; Great Master, 22 June 1897
- KT: Extra Knight of the Thistle, 24 May 1867
- KP: Extra Knight of St. Patrick, 18 March 1868
- PC(I): Member of the Privy Council of Ireland, 21 April 1868
- GCStJ: Knight of Justice of St. John, 1876; Grand Prior, 1888
- GCMG: Extra Knight Grand Cross of St Michael and St George, 31 May 1877
- GCIE: Extra Knight Grand Commander of the Indian Empire, 21 June 1887
- GCVO: Knight Grand Cross of the Royal Victorian Order, 6 May 1896
- Albert Medal of the Royal Society of Arts, 1901
- Founder and Sovereign of the Order of Merit, 26 June 1902
- Founder and Sovereign of the Imperial Service Order, 8 August 1902
- Founder of the Royal Victorian Chain, 1902

Foreign honours

Armorial achievement of the Spanish Army 62nd Regiment of Infantry "Arapiles". King Edward's cypher and the name of the British Army unit that played a prominent role in the Battle of Salamanca were added at the beginning of the Peninsular War Centenary (1908).

- Saxony: Knight of the Rue Crown, 1844
- Russia:
  - Knight of St. Andrew, with Collar, 1844
  - Knight of St. Alexander Nevsky, 1844
  - Knight of the White Eagle, 1844
  - Knight of St. Anna, 1st Class, 1844
  - Knight of St. Stanislaus, 1st Class, 1844
  - Knight of St. Vladimir, 3rd Class, 1881
- Netherlands: Grand Cross of the Netherlands Lion, 1849
- Spain:
  - Knight of the Golden Fleece, 7 May 1852
  - Grand Cross of the Order of Charles III, with Collar, 6 May 1876
- Portugal:
  - Grand Cross of the Tower and Sword, 25 November 1858
  - Grand Cross of the Sash of the Two Orders, 7 June 1865; Three Orders, 8 February 1901
- Prussia:
  - Knight of the Black Eagle, 22 December 1858; with Collar, 1869
  - Grand Cross of the Red Eagle, 2 March 1874
  - Grand Commander's Cross of the Royal House Order of Hohenzollern, 11 March 1878
  - Knight of the Royal Crown Order, 3rd Class with Red Cross on White Field on Commemorative Band, 4 April 1881
  - Knight of Honour of the Johanniter Order, 19 May 1884
- Belgium: Grand Cordon of the Order of Leopold (civil), 11 January 1859
- Sardinia: Knight of the Annunciation, 20 February 1859
- Ernestine duchies: Grand Cross of the Saxe-Ernestine House Order, December 1859
- Saxe-Weimar-Eisenach: Grand Cross of the White Falcon, 17 April 1860
- Baden:
  - Knight of the House Order of Fidelity, 1861
  - Grand Cross of the Zähringer Lion, 1861
- Ottoman Empire:
  - Order of Osmanieh, 1st Class, 25 May 1862
  - Order of the House of Osman, June 1902
- Greece: Grand Cross of the Redeemer, 29 May 1862
- Hesse and by Rhine:
  - Grand Cross of the Ludwig Order, 8 October 1862
  - Grand Cross of the Merit Order of Philip the Magnanimous, with Swords, 18 February 1878
  - Knight of the Golden Lion, 18 June 1882
- France: Grand Cross of the Legion of Honour, 15 March 1863
- Denmark:
  - Knight of the Elephant, 16 November 1863
  - Cross of Honour of the Order of the Dannebrog, 14 October 1864
  - Commemorative Medal for the Golden Wedding of King Christian IX and Queen Louise, 1892
  - Grand Commander of the Dannebrog, 9 September 1901
- Sweden:
  - Knight of the Seraphim, with Collar, 27 September 1864
  - Knight of the Order of Charles XIII, 21 December 1868
  - Commander Grand Cross of the Order of Vasa, with Collar, 26 April 1908
- Hanover:
  - Grand Cross of the Royal Guelphic Order, 1864
  - Knight of St. George, 1865
- Mecklenburg: Grand Cross of the Wendish Crown, with Crown in Ore, 13 August 1865
- Nassau: Knight of the Gold Lion of Nassau, August 1865
- Austria-Hungary: Grand Cross of the Royal Hungarian Order of St. Stephen, 13 June 1867
- Brazil: Grand Cross of the Southern Cross, 11 July 1871
- Ethiopia:
  - Grand Cross of the Seal of Solomon, 1874
  - Grand Cross of the Star of Ethiopia, 9 October 1901
- Norway: Grand Cross of St. Olav, with Collar, 3 October 1874
- Oldenburg: Grand Cross of the Order of Duke Peter Friedrich Ludwig, with Golden Crown, 24 February 1878
- Siam:
  - Knight of the Order of the Royal House of Chakri, 1880
  - Grand Cross of the White Elephant, 1887
- Military Order of Malta: Knight, 14 June 1881; Bailiff Grand Cross of Honour and Devotion
- Hawaii: Grand Cross of the Order of Kalākaua, with Collar, July 1881
- Romania:
  - Grand Cross of the Star of Romania, 1882
  - Collar of the Order of Carol I, 1906
- Württemberg: Grand Cross of the Württemberg Crown, 1883
- Japan: Grand Cordon of the Order of the Chrysanthemum, 20 September 1886; Collar, 13 April 1902
- Bavaria: Knight of St. Hubert, 19 March 1901
- Monaco: Grand Cross of St. Charles, 25 June 1902
- San Marino: Grand Cross of the Order of San Marino, August 1902
- Montenegro: Grand Cross of the Order of Prince Danilo I, 1902
- Persia: Order of the Aqdas, 1st Class, 1904

=== Honorary foreign military appointments ===
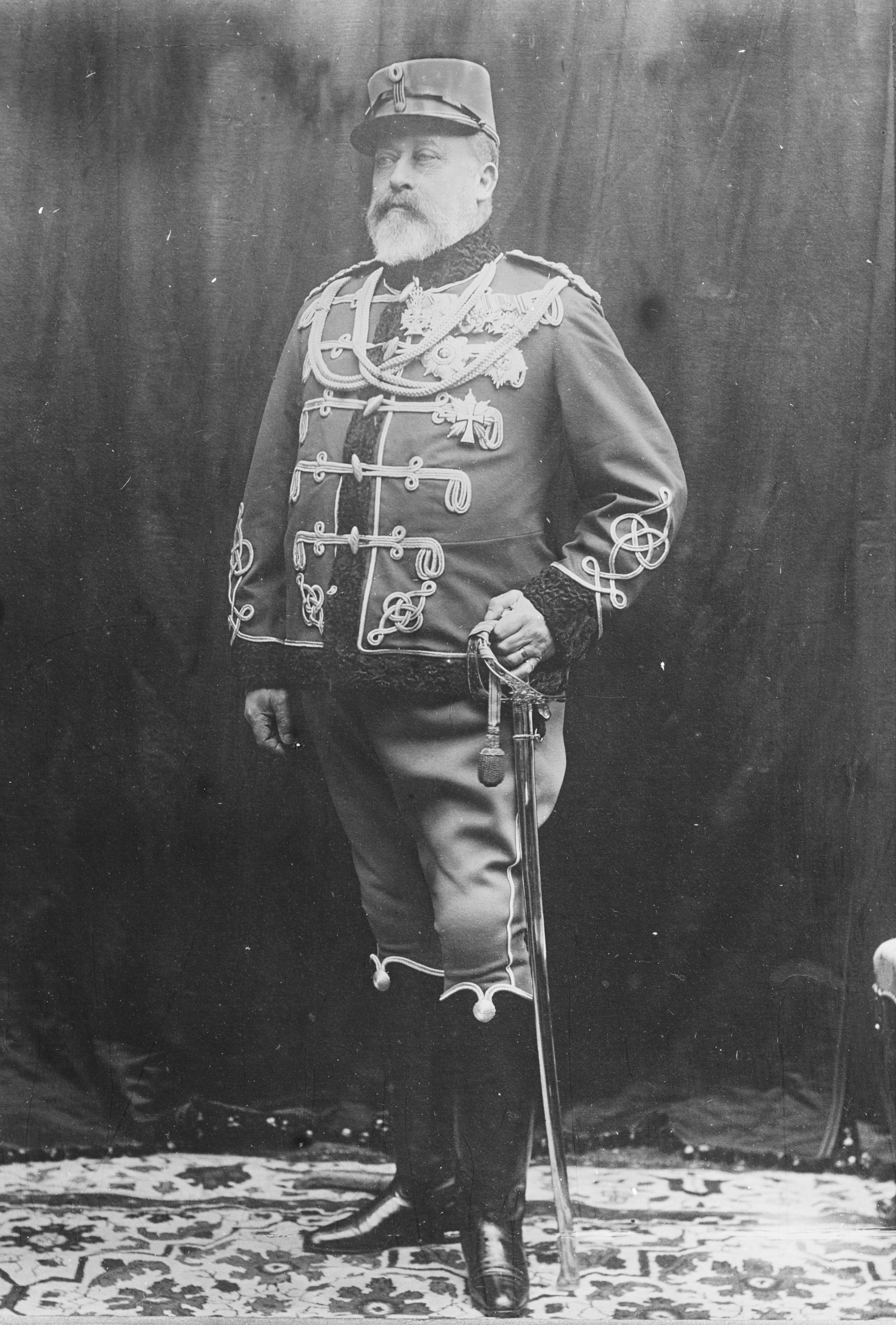
Edward VII wearing the uniform of the Danish Guard Hussar Regiment

- 28 September 1879: Honorary Colonel of the Danish Guard Hussar Regiment
- 1883: Field Marshal (Generalfeldmarschall) of the German Army
- 5 February 1901: Honorary Colonel of the 27th (King Edward's) Regiment of Dragoons of Kiev
- 26 June 1902: Admiral of the Fleet (Großadmiral) à la suite of the Imperial German Navy
- Honorary Captain General of the Spanish Army
- Honorary Admiral of the Spanish Navy
- Colonel-in-Chief of the German regiment 5th (Pomeranian) Hussars "Prince Blücher of Wahlstatt"
- Colonel-in-Chief 1st Guards Dragoons "Queen of Great Britain and Ireland"
- Honorary Colonel of the Infantry Regiment "Zamora" No. 8 (Spain)
- 1905: Honorary Admiral of the Swedish Navy
- 1908: Honorary General of the Swedish Army
- Honorary Admiral of the Greek Navy
- Honorary General of the Norwegian Army

=== Arms and cypher ===
Edward's coat of arms as the Prince of Wales was the royal arms, differenced by a label of three points argent and an inescutcheon of the Duchy of Saxony, representing his paternal arms. When he acceded as king, he gained the royal arms undifferenced and considered adding the arms of Saxony and a representation for Wales but was dissuaded by officials. The War Office raised the issue of a standardised design for the heraldic crown for use on his royal cypher and elsewhere, there having been in use several different patterns of heraldic crown during the reign of Queen Victoria. Edward approved a design based on the Tudor Crown, as "chosen and always used by Queen Victoria personally".

Coat of arms as Prince of Wales, 1841–1901

Royal coat of arms outside Scotland

Royal coat of arms in Scotland

Royal cypher

== Issue ==
Name	Birth	Death	Marriage/notes
Prince Albert Victor, Duke of Clarence and Avondale	8 January 1864	14 January 1892 (aged 28)	engaged 1891, to Princess Victoria Mary of Teck
George V	3 June 1865	20 January 1936 (aged 70)	1893, Princess Victoria Mary of Teck; had issue including Edward VIII and George VI
Louise, Princess Royal	20 February 1867	4 January 1931 (aged 63)	1889, Alexander Duff, 1st Duke of Fife; had issue
Princess Victoria	6 July 1868	3 December 1935 (aged 67)	never married and without issue
Princess Maud	26 November 1869	20 November 1938 (aged 68)	1896, Prince Carl of Denmark (King of Norway as Haakon VII from 1905); had one child Prince Alexander (later Olav V)
Prince Alexander John of Wales	6 April 1871	7 April 1871	Born and died at Sandringham House

== Ancestry ==
Ancestors of Edward VII

8. Francis, Duke of Saxe-Coburg-Saalfeld (= 14)
4. Ernest I of Saxe-Coburg and Gotha
9. Countess Augusta Reuss of Ebersdorf (= 15)
2. Prince Albert of Saxe-Coburg and Gotha
10. Augustus, Duke of Saxe-Gotha-Altenburg
5. Princess Louise of Saxe-Gotha-Altenburg
11. Duchess Louise Charlotte of Mecklenburg-Schwerin
1. Edward VII of the United Kingdom
12. George III of the United Kingdom
6. Prince Edward, Duke of Kent and Strathearn
13. Princess Charlotte of Mecklenburg-Strelitz
3. Queen Victoria of the United Kingdom
14. Francis, Duke of Saxe-Coburg-Saalfeld (= 8)
7. Princess Victoria of Saxe-Coburg-Saalfeld
15. Countess Augusta Reuss of Ebersdorf (= 9)

== See also ==
- Love chair (siège d'amour), sex chair invented for Edward
- Household of Edward VII and Alexandra
- Edward the Seventh, a 1975 television miniseries.

== Notes ==
Edward VII House of Saxe-Coburg and Gotha Cadet branch of the House of Wettin Born: 9 November 1841 Died: 6 May 1910
Regnal titles
Preceded by Victoria	King of the United Kingdom and the British Dominions; Emperor of India; 22 January 1901 – 6 May 1910	Succeeded by George V
British royalty
Vacant Title last held by George (IV)	Prince of Wales; Duke of Cornwall; Duke of Rothesay; 1841–1901	Succeeded by George (V)
Military offices
Preceded by The Earl Beauchamp	Colonel of the 10th (Prince of Wales's Own Royal) Hussars; 1863–1901	Succeeded by Lord Ralph Drury Kerr
Masonic offices
Preceded by The Marquess of Ripon	Grand Master of the United; Grand Lodge of England; 1874–1901	Succeeded by The Duke of Connaught and Strathearn
Honorary titles
Vacant Title last held by The Prince Consort	Great Master of the Bath; 1897–1901	Succeeded by The Duke of Connaught and Strathearn
