= UTC+00:30 =

Former time zone

- Time zone

UTC offset
- UTC: UTC+00:30

Current time
- 17:20, 25 August 2026 UTC+00:30 [refresh]

Central meridian
- 7.5 degrees E

Date-time group
- Z*

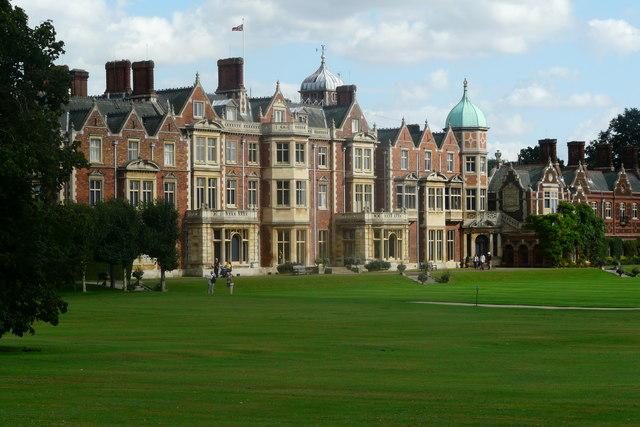
Sandringham Castle, which used a UTC+00:30 Time Offset

UTC+00:30 is an identifier for a time offset from UTC of +00:30.

== History ==
It was used in Switzerland (Bernese Time) until the adoption of Central European Time in 1894.

Known as Sandringham time, an offset of 30 minutes from GMT was used by the British royal household at the Norfolk estate Sandringham. This was stopped in 1936.

The British Gold Coast briefly observed the offset as standard time between 1942 and 1945, and as daylight saving time between 1950 and 1956.

== See also ==
- Time in Switzerland
- Time in the United Kingdom
- UTC+00:20
