= The Coronation of Queen Victoria (Hayter) =

1839 painting by George Hayter

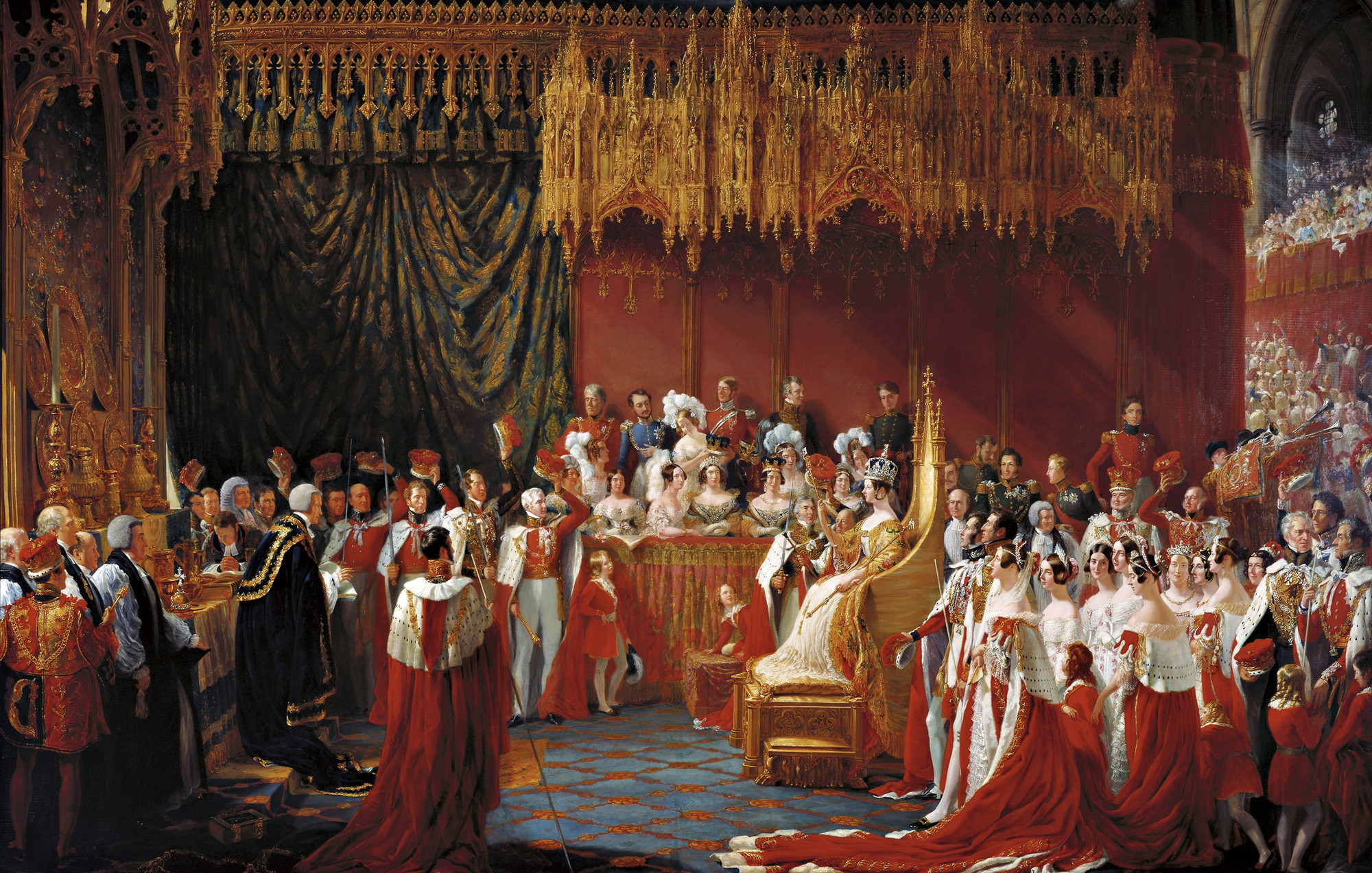
- Artist: George Hayter
- Year: 1839
- Type: Oil on canvas, historical painting
- Dimensions: 255.3 cm × 381 cm (100.5 in × 150 in)
- Location: Royal Collection, London

The Coronation of Queen Victoria is an 1839 painting by the British artist George Hayter. It depicts in oils the coronation of Queen Victoria at Westminster Abbey on 28 June 1838. Victoria was eighteen when she succeeded her uncle William IV to the throne on 20 June 1837 and went on to reign until 1901.

Hayter was commissioned to record the scene less than a week before the coronation for a fee of 2,000 guineas. He had already shown his skill with crowd scenes at important contemporary events with The Trial of Queen Caroline (1823) and the Reformed House of Commons (1833). He was later appointed Principal Painter in Ordinary, despite the notional seniority of the Irish artist Sir Martin Archer Shee, the President of the Royal Academy.

The politician and future Prime Minister Lord Aberdeen suggested that the painting should portray the actual moment of crowning, but Victoria rejected this idea as she didn't want to be depicted with her head bowed. Instead it shows the moment shortly afterwards, as the new Queen is acclaimed. Hayter's work depicts sixty four of those present at the coronation, based on private sittings following the event. The Queen is seen wearing the Imperial State Crown.

In 1842 Hayter completed The Marriage of Queen Victoria, which depicts the wedding of Victoria to Prince Albert, and in 1845 exhibited The Christening of the Prince of Wales, the future Edward VII. The latter painting belongs to the Royal Collection in London, having been acquired by the Lord Chamberlain in 1892. It is on display in the East Gallery in Buckingham Palace.

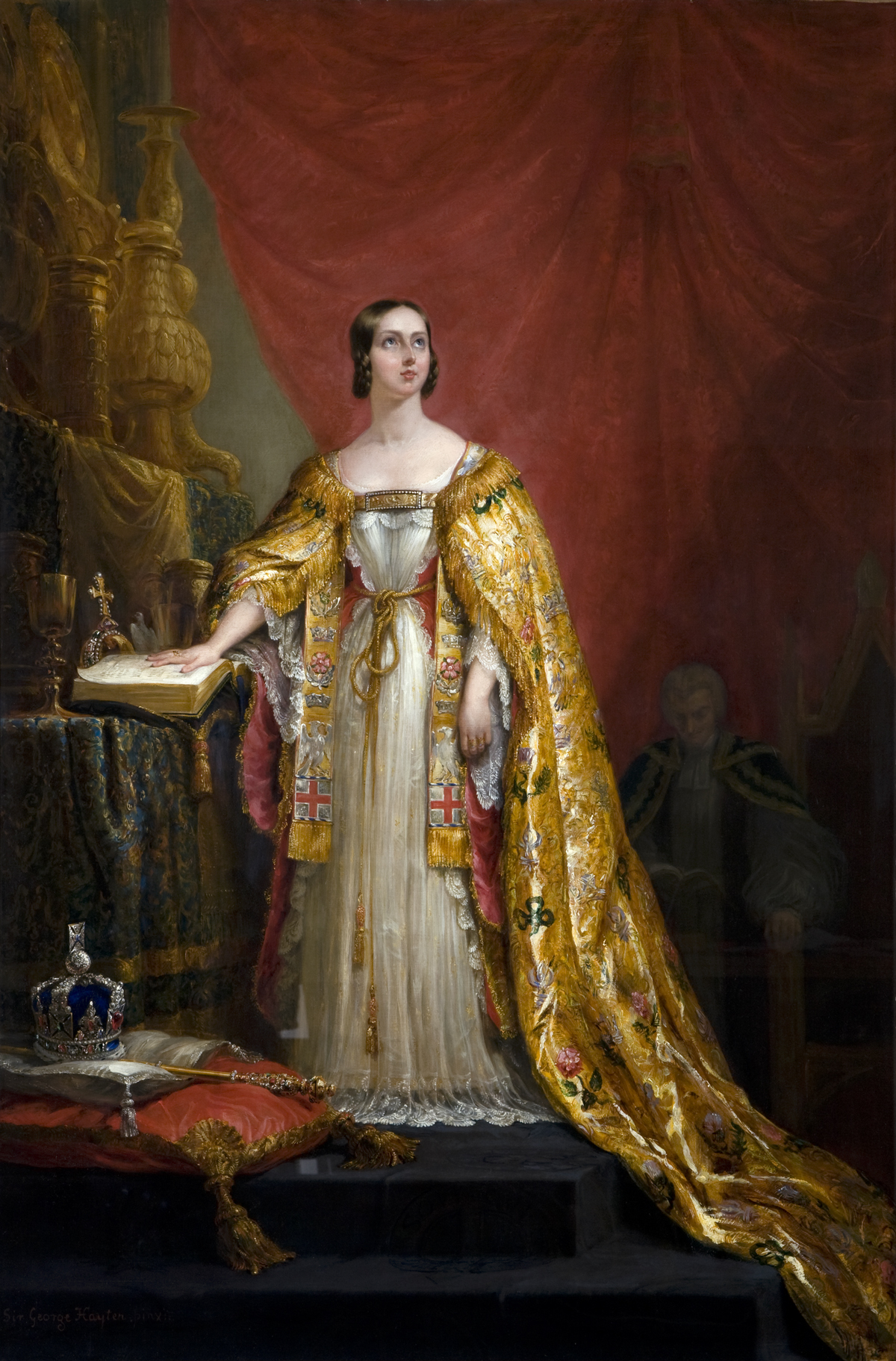
A companion piece Queen Victoria taking the Coronation Oath by Hayter, 1838.

== See also ==
- The Banquet at the Coronation of George IV, 1822 painting by George Jones
- The First Council of Queen Victoria, 1838 painting by David Wilkie

== Bibliography ==
- Johnson, Malcolm. Bustling Intermeddler?: The Life and Work of Charles James Blomfield. Gracewing Publishing, 2001.
- Plunkett, John. Queen Victoria: First Media Monarch. Oxford University Press, 2003.
