= The Christening of the Prince of Wales =

1845 painting by George Hayter

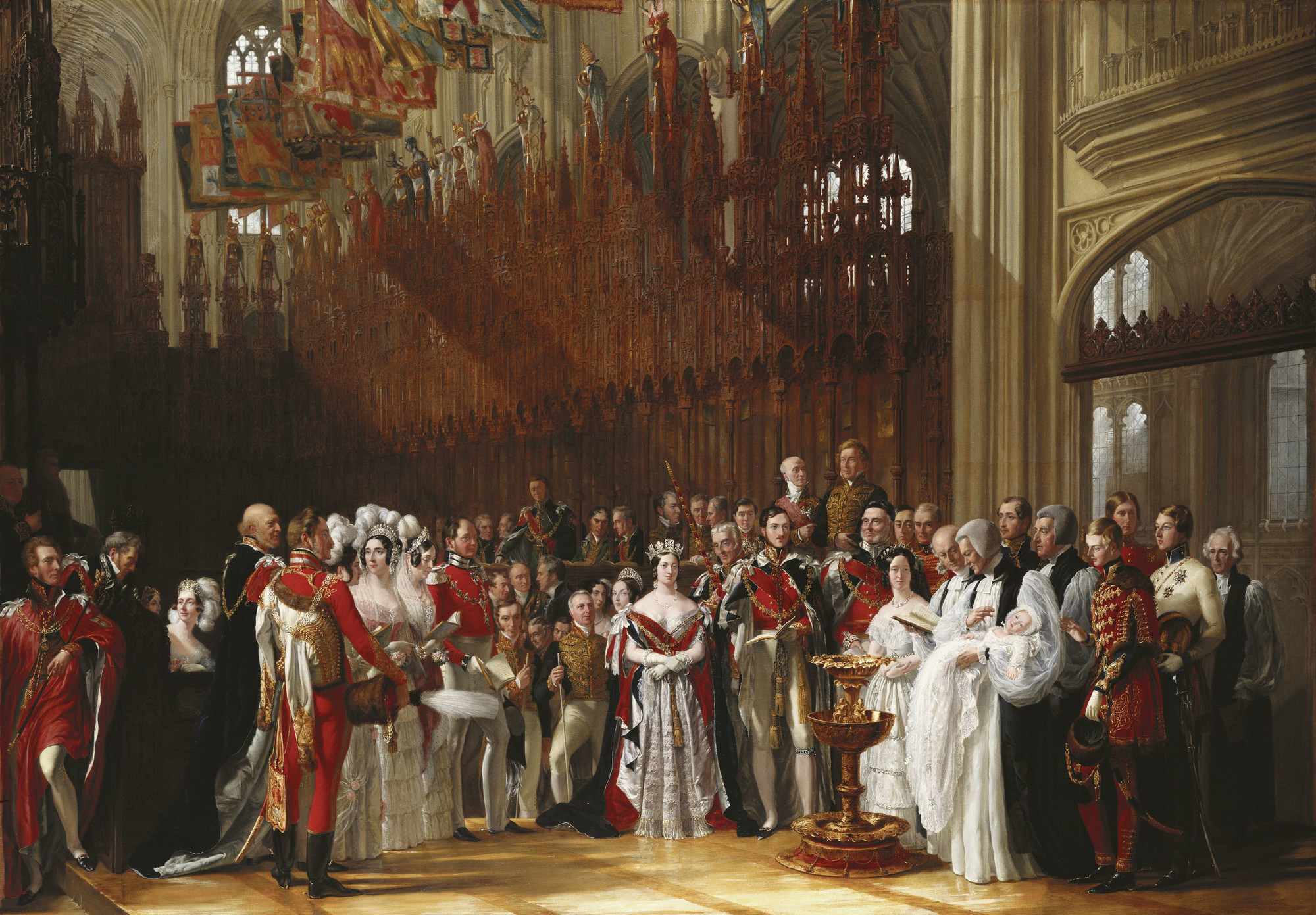
- Artist: George Hayter
- Year: 1845
- Type: Oil on canvas
- Dimensions: 193 cm × 275.5 cm (76 in × 108.5 in)
- Location: East Gallery, Buckingham Palace, London

The Christening of the Prince of Wales is an oil on canvas history painting by the British artist Sir George Hayter, from 1843. It was first exhibited at Windsor Castle in 1845.

== History and description ==
It depicts the christening on 25 January 1842 of Albert Edward, the infant Prince of Wales and eldest son and heir of Queen Victoria and her husband Albert, the Prince Consort. Hayter, appointed Principal Painter in Ordinary in 1841, had previously painted The Coronation of Queen Victoria and The Marriage of Queen Victoria.

The painting depicts the ceremony at St George's Chapel at Windsor Castle. It portrays forty-nine of those present. The Prince would go on to reign under his regnal title Edward VII from 1901 to 1910, giving his name to the Edwardian era. Queen Victoria was apparently unimpressed by the painting, and did not wish to buy it unlike Hayter's previous works, as she claimed it was too large to hang in any of her palaces. It was ultimately purchased for the Royal Collection in 1871 and is now on display in Buckingham Palace.

== See also ==
- The Marriage of the Prince of Wales, 1865 painting

== Bibliography ==
- Chilvers, Ian. The Oxford Dictionary of Art and Artists. Oxford University Press, 2015.
- Plunkett, John. Queen Victoria: First Media Monarch. Oxford University Press, 2003.
