= The Landing of Princess Alexandra at Gravesend =

Painting by Henry Nelson O'Neil

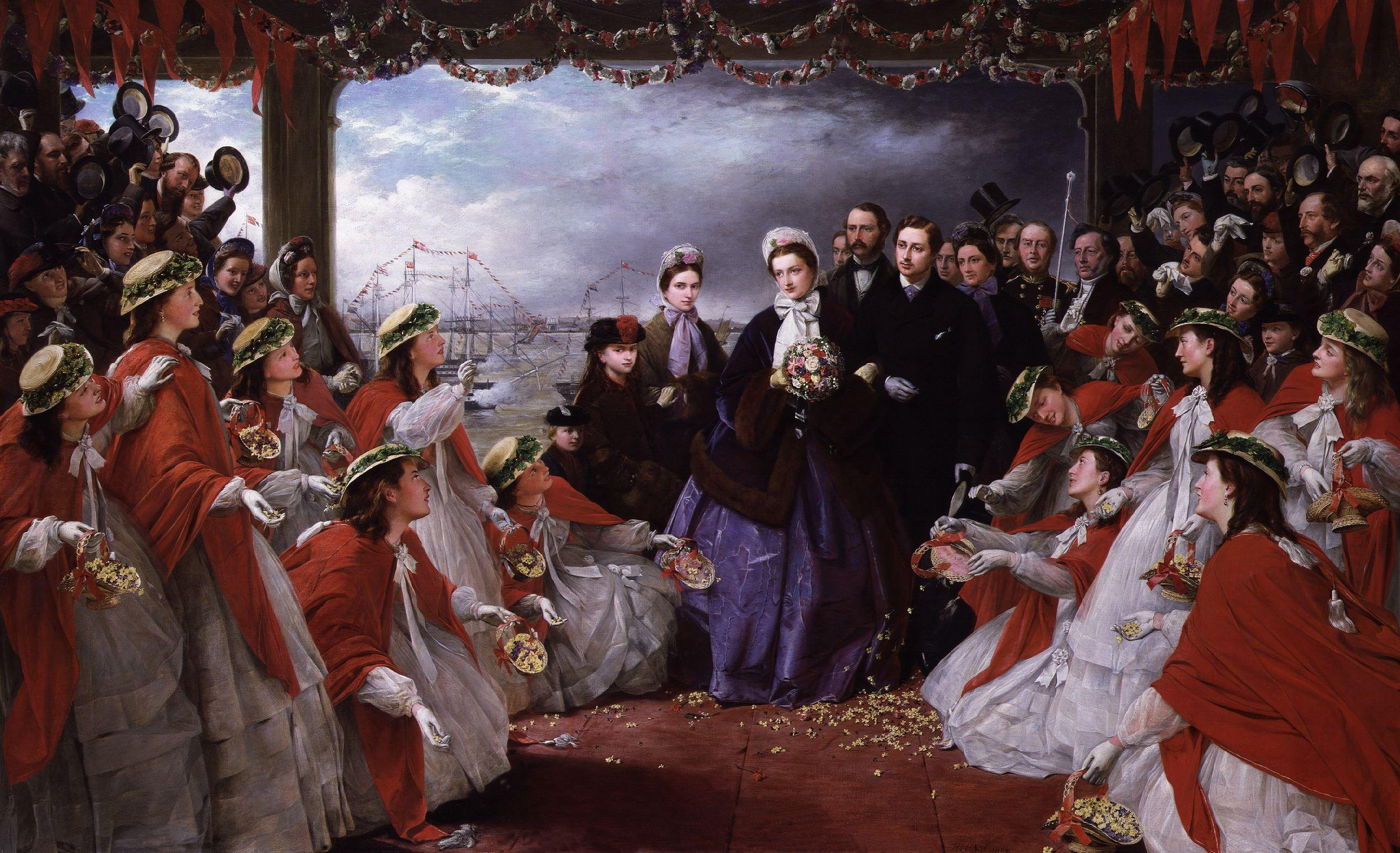
- Artist: Henry Nelson O'Neil
- Year: 1864
- Type: Oil on canvas, history
- Dimensions: 132.1 cm × 213.4 cm (52.0 in × 84.0 in)
- Location: National Portrait Gallery, London

The Landing of Princess Alexandra at Gravesend is an 1864 oil painting by the British artist Henry Nelson O'Neil. It depicts the arrival of Alexandra of Denmark at Gravesend in Kent on 7 March 1863 accompanied by her family. Alexandra had arrived in Britain for her wedding with the Prince of Wales, the son and heir of Queen Victoria. The wedding took place three days later in St George's Chapel, Windsor Castle and was notably painted as The Marriage of the Prince of Wales by William Powell Frith, who like O'Neil, had been a member of the artistic group The Clique.

O'Neill depicts the scene on the Royal Terrace Pier after Alexandra had landed after a voyage across the North Sea on the royal yacht HMY Victoria and Albert. Alexandra, accompanied by members of the Danish Royal Family, is escorted by her future husband Albert Edward, Prince of Wales. In front of them girls dress in red and white (the Danish national colours) scatter scatter baskets of violets and primroses. O'Neill included fifty different portraits in the work including Christian IX of Denmark, Louise of Hesse-Kassel, Frederick VIII of Denmark, Princess Dagmar, Princess Thyra and George I of Greece. Henry Seymour, the commander of the royal yacht is also depicted and O'Neil added a self-portrait of himself in the top right-hand side. The work was displayed at the Royal Academy Exhibition of 1864. The painting is in the collection of the National Portrait Gallery in London. A smaller preparatory version is in the collection of the National Maritime Museum in Greenwich.

== Bibliography ==
- Bentley-Crantch, Dana. Edward VII: Image of an Era, 1841-1910. H.M. Stationery Office, 1992.
- Bills, Mark & Knight, Vivien (ed.) William Powell Frith: Painting the Victorian Age. Yale University Press, 2006
- Byrde, Penelope. Nineteenth Century Fashion. Batsford, 1992.
