= The Trial of William Lord Russell =

Painting by George Hayter

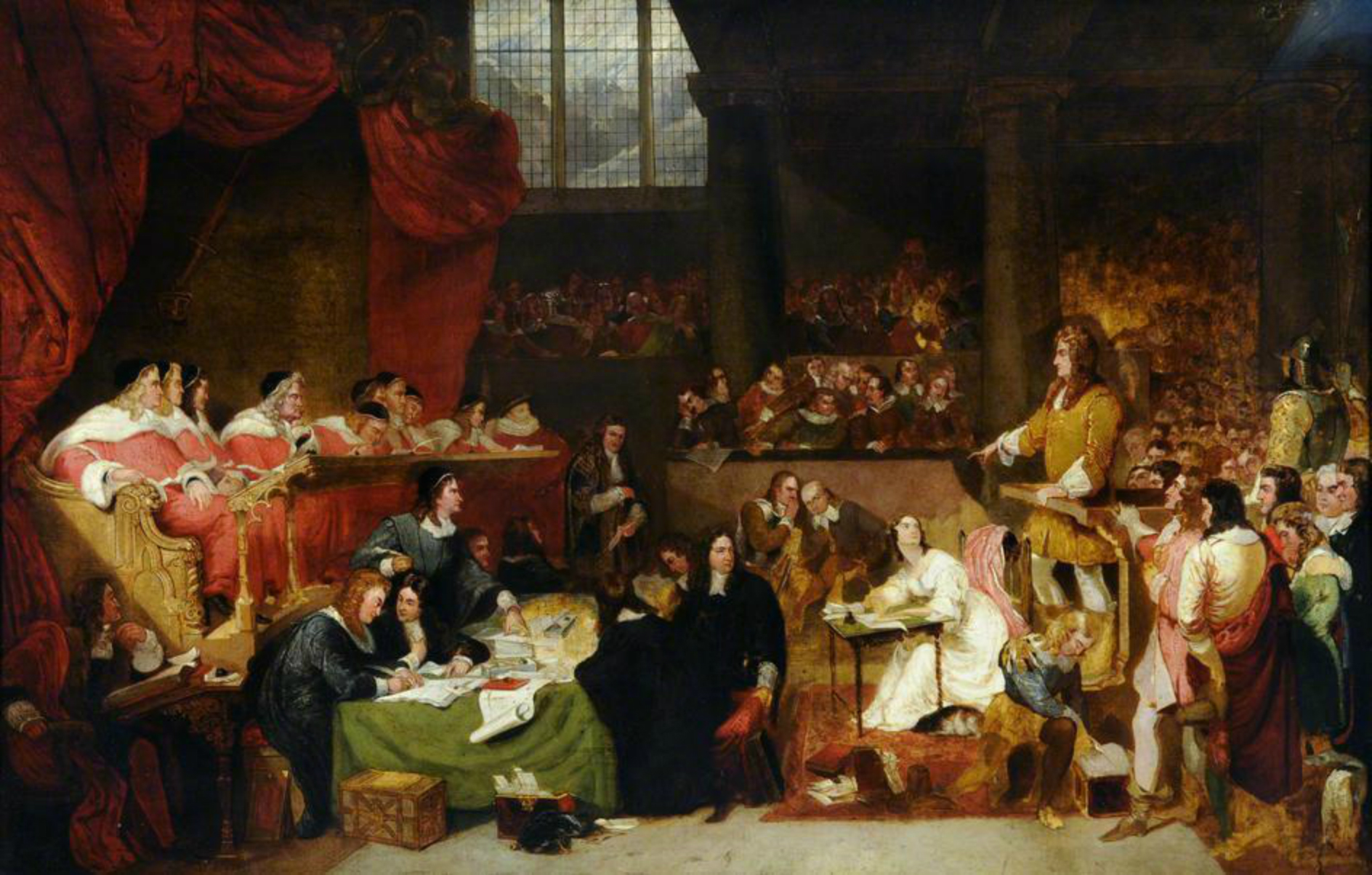
- Artist: George Hayter
- Year: 1825
- Type: Oil on canvas
- Dimensions: 70 cm × 108 cm (28 in × 43 in)
- Location: Ferens Art Gallery, Kingston upon Hull

The Trial of William Lord Russell in 1683 is an 1825 history painting by the British artist George Hayter. It is held at Ferens Art Gallery, in Kingston upon Hull.

== History and description ==
The work portrays the trial at the Old Bailey in London of William Russell, Lord Russell, a Whig who was convicted of treason for his alleged part in the Rye House Plot of 1683 to assassinate Charles II and his brother and heir James, Duke of York. The painting portrays Russell's trial and conviction, shortly before his execution.

Hayter had already developed his reputation for portraying dramatic scenes with his Trial of Queen Caroline, finished in 1823. This subsequent work was exhibited at the Royal Academy's summer exhibition at Somerset House in 1825. For this work he was commissioned by the Duke of Bedford, who was descended from the executed man, and it is sympathetic in tone. Hayter went on to paint further crowd scenes including The Reformed House of Commons as well as three paintings depicting the coronation, wedding and baptism of the heir of Queen Victoria.

== Bibliography ==
- Miller, Henry. Politics personified: Portraiture, caricature and visual culture in Britain, c.1830–80. Manchester University Press, 16 May 2016
- Ormond, Richard. Edwin Landseer: The Private Drawings. Unicorn Press, 2009.
- Schwoerer, Lois G. Lady Rachel Russell: "One of the Best of Women". JHU Press, 2019.
