= 1832 United Kingdom general election =

- 8 December 1832 – 8 January 1833

All 658 seats in the House of Commons 330 seats needed for a majority
- Turnout: 827,776
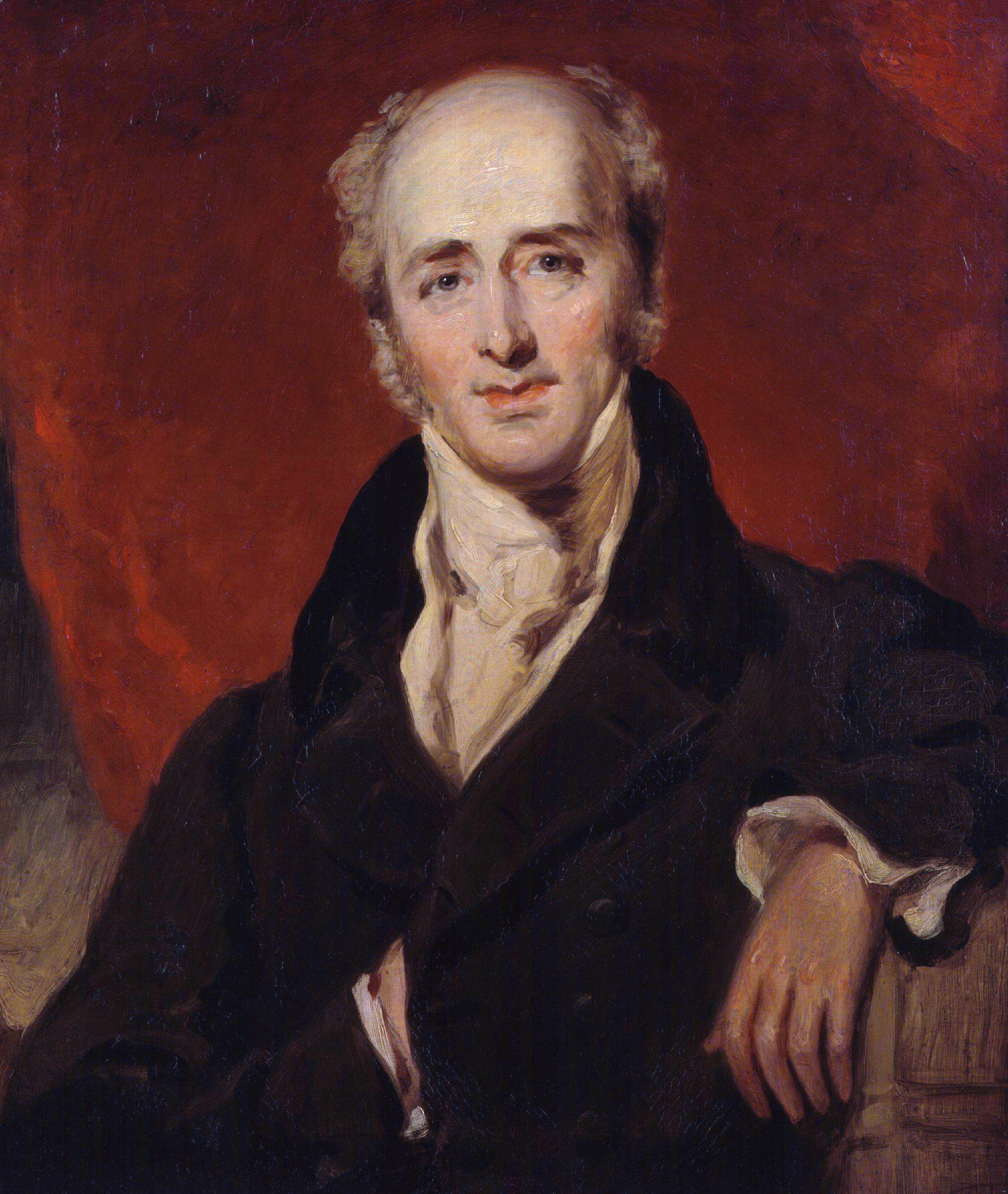

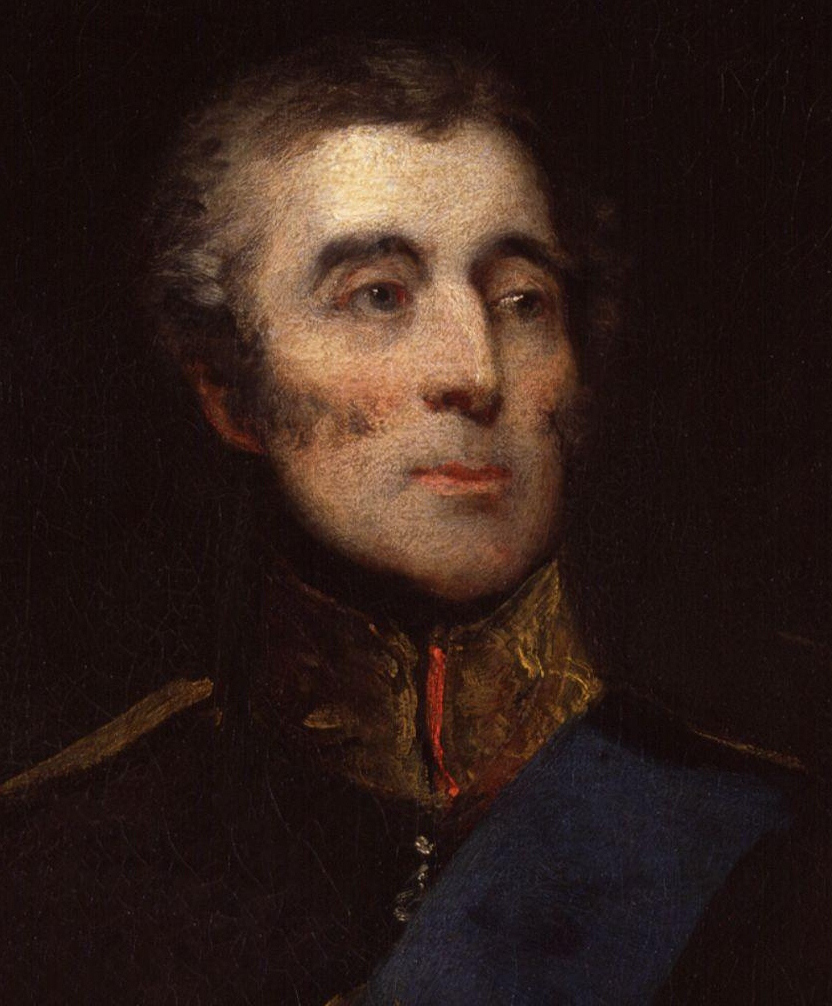

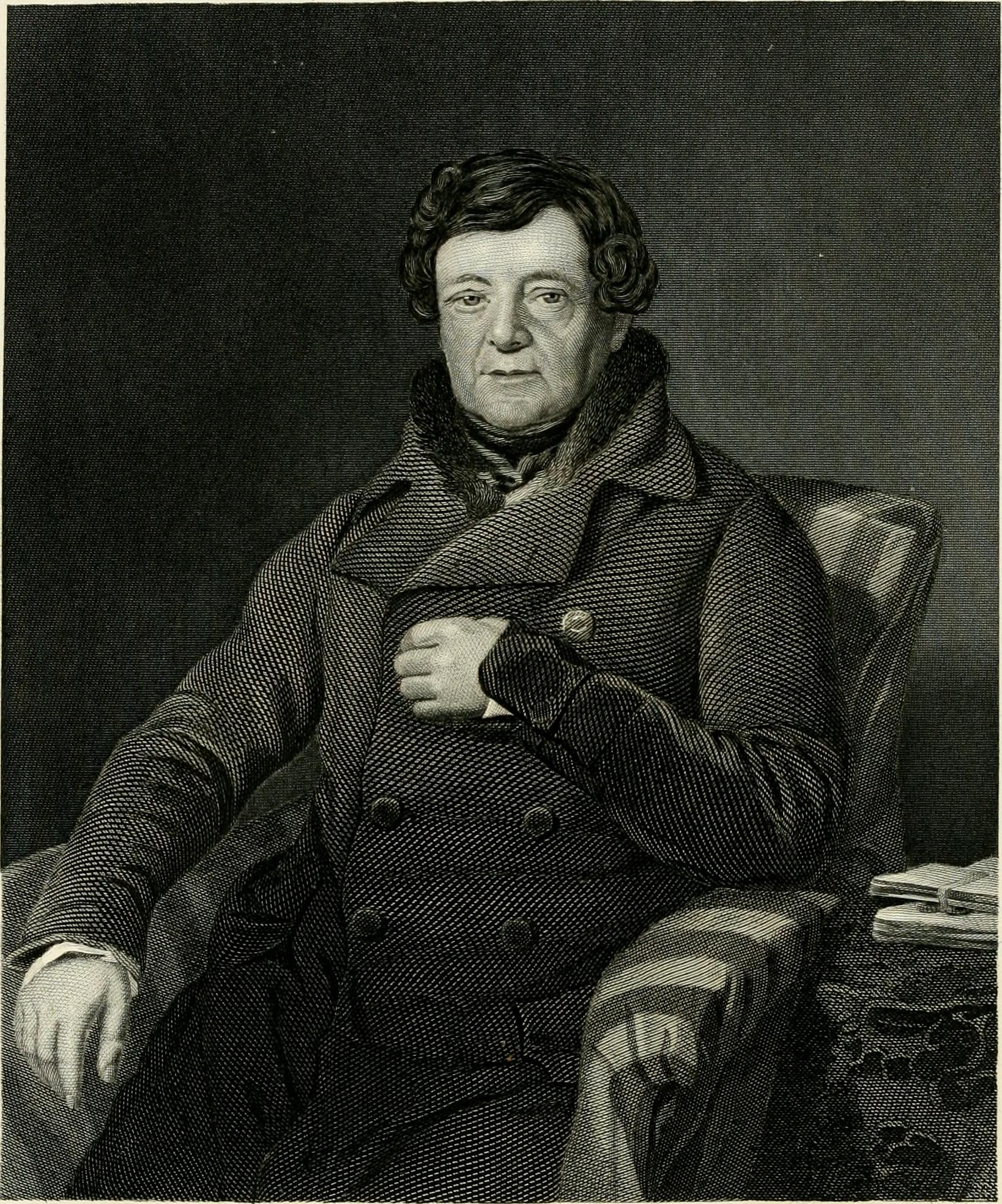
	First party	Second party	Third party
Leader	Earl Grey	Duke of Wellington	Daniel O'Connell
Party	Whig	Tory	Repeal
Leader since	22 November 1830	22 January 1828	1830
Leader's seat	House of Lords	House of Lords	Dublin City
Seats before	370 seats, 63.3%	235 seats, 36.7%	Did not contest
Seats won	441 (Note: Includes 109 members elected unopposed.)	175 (Note: Includes 66 members elected unopposed.)	42 (Note: Includes 14 members elected unopposed.)
Seat change	▲71	▼60	▲42
Popular vote	554,719 (Note: Voting took place in 469 of 658 seats. The other 189 MPs were unopposed.)	241,284	31,773
Percentage	67.0%	29.2%	3.8%
Swing	▲3.7pp	▼7.5pp	New party
- Colours denote the winning party. Strength of colour indicates number of candidates returned.

- Composition of the House of Commons after the election
Prime Minister before election
Earl Grey
Whig
Prime Minister after election
Earl Grey
Whig

The 1832 United Kingdom general election was held on 8 December 1832 to 8 January 1833. The first election to be held in the newly reformed House of Commons, the Whigs under Earl Grey won a landslide victory with a majority of 224 seats.

Earl Grey, Prime Minister since November 1830, led the first predominantly Whig administration since 1806–07, supported by Radicals and allied politicians, though no formal Liberal Party existed yet. Viscount Althorp led the House of Commons and served as Chancellor of the Exchequer. The Tories, led by the Duke of Wellington and Sir Robert Peel, had not fully adopted the Conservative label. In Ireland, Daniel O'Connell's Irish Repeal Association campaigned for the repeal of the Act of Union, presenting independent candidates.

The election took place from December 1832 to January 1833, with polling staggered across constituencies. The Whigs won an overall majority of 224 seats, 67%, the Tories 27%, and the Repeal Association 6%. The Whigs won 67% of the vote, the Tories 29%, and the Repeal Association 4%. The results varied by region, with the Whigs dominant in Great Britain, but facing stronger Tory opposition in Wales and Ireland.

This was the first election after the Reform Act 1832, and the last election before the Tories formally reconstituted themselves into the Conservatives, and the last time until 1906 that they won fewer than 200 seats.

== Political situation ==
The Earl Grey had been prime minister since November 1830. He headed the first predominantly Whig administration since the Ministry of All the Talents in 1806–07.

In addition to the Whigs themselves, Grey was supported by Radical and other allied politicians. The Whigs and their allies were gradually coming to be referred to as liberals, but no formal Liberal Party had been established at the time of this election, so all the politicians supporting the ministry are referred to as Whig in the above results.

The Leader of the House of Commons since 1830 was Viscount Althorp (heir of the Earl Spencer), who also served as Chancellor of the Exchequer.

The last Tory prime minister, at the time of this election, was the Duke of Wellington. After leaving government office, Wellington continued to lead the Tory peers and was the overall Leader of the Opposition.

The Tory Leader of the Opposition in the House of Commons was Sir Robert Peel, Bt.

John Wilson Croker had used the term "conservative" in 1830, but the Tories at the time of this election had not yet become generally known as the Conservative Party. This distinction would finally take hold after the Liberal Party was officially created.

In Irish politics, Daniel O'Connell was continuing his campaign for repeal of the Act of Union. He had founded the Irish Repeal Association and it presented candidates independent of the two principal parties.

== Dates of election ==
Following the passage of the Reform Act 1832 and related legislation to reform the electoral system and redistribute constituencies, the tenth United Kingdom Parliament was dissolved on 3 December 1832. The new Parliament was summoned to meet on 29 January 1833, for a maximum seven-year term from that date. The maximum term could be and normally was curtailed, by the monarch dissolving the Parliament, before its term expired.

At this period there was not one election day. After receiving a writ (a royal command) for the election to be held, the local returning officer fixed the election timetable for the particular constituency or constituencies he was concerned with. Polling in seats with contested elections could continue for many days.

The general election took place between December 1832 and January 1833. The first nomination was on 8 December, with the first contest on 10 December and the last contest on 8 January 1833. It was usual for polling in the university constituencies and in Orkney and Shetland to take place about a week after other seats. Disregarding contests in the Universities and Orkney and Shetland, the last poll was on 1 January 1833.

== Summary of the constituencies ==
For the distribution of constituencies in the unreformed House of Commons, before this election, see the 1831 United Kingdom general election. Apart from the disenfranchisement of Grampound for corruption in 1821 and the transfer of its two seats as additional members for Yorkshire from 1826, there had been no change in the constituencies of England since the 1670s. In some cases the county and borough seats had remained unaltered since the 13th century. Welsh constituencies had been unchanged since the 16th century. Those in Scotland had remained the same since 1708 and in Ireland since 1801.

In 1832 politicians were facing an unfamiliar electoral map, as well as an electorate including those qualified under a new uniform householder franchise in the boroughs. However the reform legislation had not removed all the anomalies in the electoral system.

Table of largest and smallest electorates 1832–33, by country, type and number of seats

Country	Type	Seats	Largest constituency	Largest electorate	Smallest constituency	Smallest electorate
England	Borough	1	Salford	1,497	Reigate	153
England	Borough	2	Westminster	11,576	Thetford	146
England	Borough	4	City of London	18,584	—	—
England	County	1	Isle of Wight	1,167	—	—
England	County	2	West Riding of Yorkshire	18,056	Rutland	1,296
England	County	3	Cambridgeshire	6,435	Oxfordshire	4,721
England	University	2	Oxford University	2,496	Cambridge University	2,319
Wales	Borough	1	Flint Boroughs	1,359	Brecon	242
Wales	County	1	Pembrokeshire	3,700	Merionethshire	580
Wales	County	2	Carmarthenshire	3,887	Denbighshire	3,401
Scotland	Burgh	1	Aberdeen	2,024	Wigtown Burghs	316
Scotland	Burgh	2	Glasgow	6,989	Edinburgh	6,048
Scotland	County	1	Perthshire	3,180	Sutherland	84
Ireland	Borough	1	Carrickfergus	1,024	Lisburn	91
Ireland	Borough	2	Dublin	7,008	Waterford	1,241
Ireland	County	2	County Cork	3,835	County Kildare	1,112
Ireland	University	2	Dublin University	2,073	—	—

Monmouthshire (1 County constituency with 2 MPs and one single member Borough constituency) is included in Wales in these tables. Sources for this period may include the county in England.

Table 1: Constituencies and MPs, by type and country

Country	BC	CC	UC	Total C	BMP	CMP	UMP	Total MPs
England	186	68	2	256	322	142	4	468
Wales	15	13	0	28	15	17	0	32
Scotland	21	30	0	51	23	30	0	53
Ireland	33	32	1	66	39	64	2	105
Total	255	143	3	401	399	253	6	658

Table 2: Number of seats per constituency, by type and country

Country	BCx1	BCx2	BCx4	CCx1	CCx2	CCx3	UCx2	Total C
England	52	133	1	1	60	7	2	256
Wales	15	0	0	9	4	0	0	28
Scotland	19	2	0	30	0	0	0	51
Ireland	27	6	0	0	32	0	1	66
Total	113	141	1	40	96	7	3	401

== Results ==

UK General Election 1832
Party	Candidates						Votes		
Party	Stood	Elected	Gained	Unseated	Net	% of total	%	No.	Net %
Whig	636	441				67.02	67.01	554,719	
Tory	350	175				26.60	29.15	241,284	
Repeal	51	42				6.38	3.84	31,773	

Party	Candidates	Unopposed	Seats
Whig	636	109	441
Tory	350	66	175
Repeal	51	14	42
Total	1,037	189	658

=== Voting summary ===
Popular vote
Whig	67.01%
Tory	29.15%
Irish Repeal	3.84%

=== Seats summary ===
Parliamentary seats
Whig	67.02%
Tory	26.6%
Irish Repeal	6.38%

=== Regional results ===
==== Great Britain ====
Party	Seats	Seats change	Votes	%	% change
Whig	408		525,706	71.1	
Tory	147		213,254	28.9	
Total	555		738,960	100	

===== England =====
Party	Seats	Seats change	Votes	%	% change
Whig	347		474,542	70.8	
Tory	117		193,442	29.2	
Total	464		667,984	100	

===== Scotland =====
Party	Seats	Seats change	Votes	%	% change
Whig	43		44,003	79.0	
Tory	10		9,752	21.0	
Total	53		53,755	100	

===== Wales =====
Party	Seats	Seats change	Votes	%	% change
Whig	18		6,348	46.6	
Tory	14		7,466	53.4	
Total	32		13,814	100	

==== Ireland ====
Party	Seats	Seats change	Votes	%	% change
Repeal	42		31,773	34.6	
Whig	33		29,013	33.3	
Tory	28		28,030	32.1	
Total	103		88,816	100	

==== Universities ====
Party	Seats	Seats change	Votes	%	% change
Tory	6		2,594	76.2	
Whig	0		813	23.8	
Total	6		3,407	100	

== See also ==
- List of United Kingdom general elections
- List of MPs elected in the 1832 United Kingdom general election
- The House of Commons, 1833, painting by George Hayter
