= Royal Terrace Pier =

Coordinates: 51.4450°N 0.3746°E

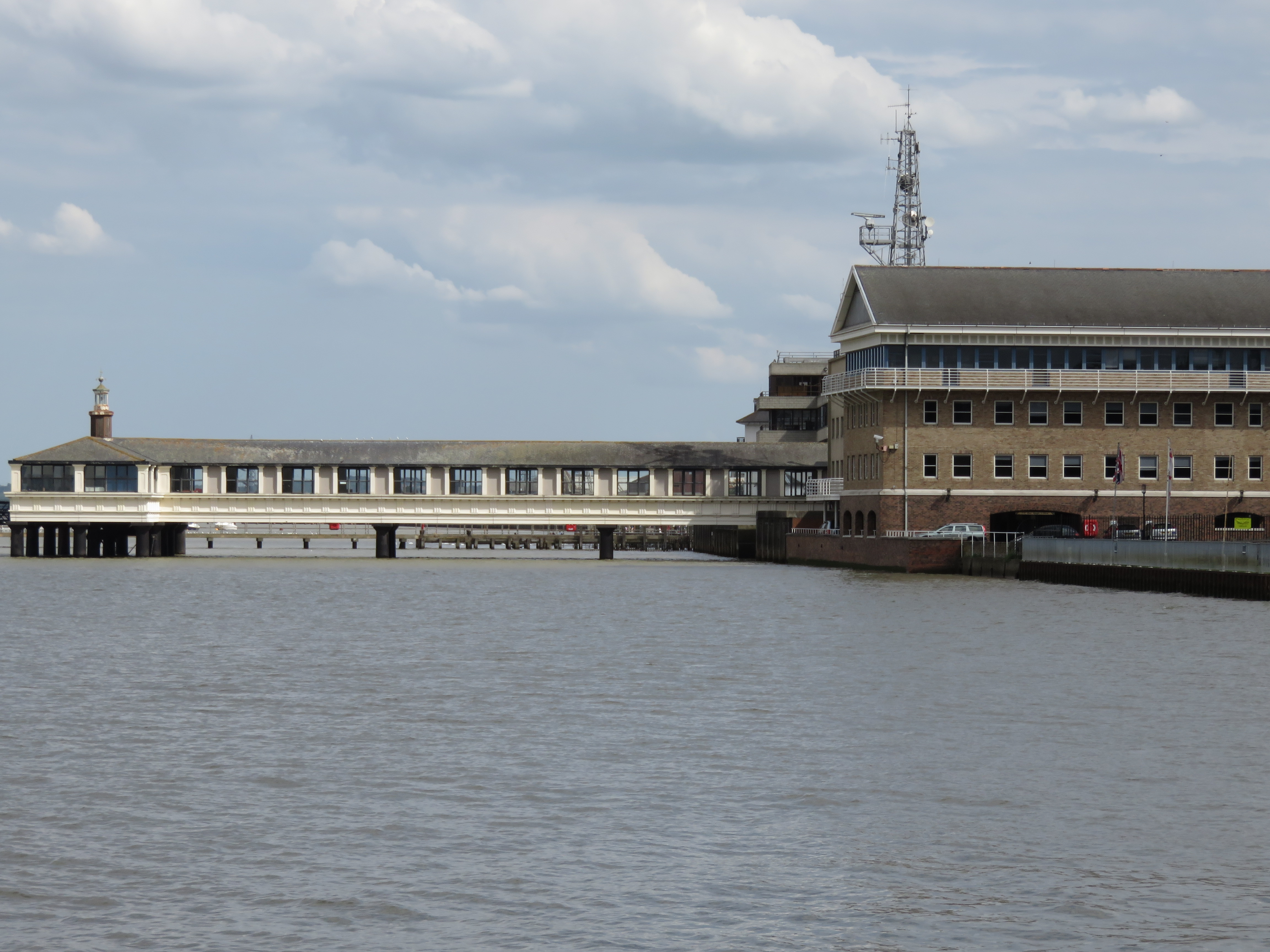
Royal Terrace Pier and London River House, Gravesend

Royal Terrace Pier is owned and managed by the Port of London Authority (PLA) and is located adjacent to their headquarters at London River House in Gravesend.

== History ==
Gravesend Royal Terrace Garden Pier Act 1842
- Act of Parliament
- Parliament of the United Kingdom
- Long title: An Act for erecting a Pier at the Royal Terrace Gardens in the Town of Gravesend in the County of Kent.
- Citation: 5 & 6 Vict. c. lix

Dates
- Royal assent: 18 June 1842

Text of statute as originally enacted

The Grade II listed pier was built in 1844 by the Gravesend Freehold Investment Company. Designed by architect John Baldry Redman the building cost was £9,200. On 7 March 1863 Princess Alexandra disembarked here when she arrived to marry the Prince of Wales (later Edward VII).

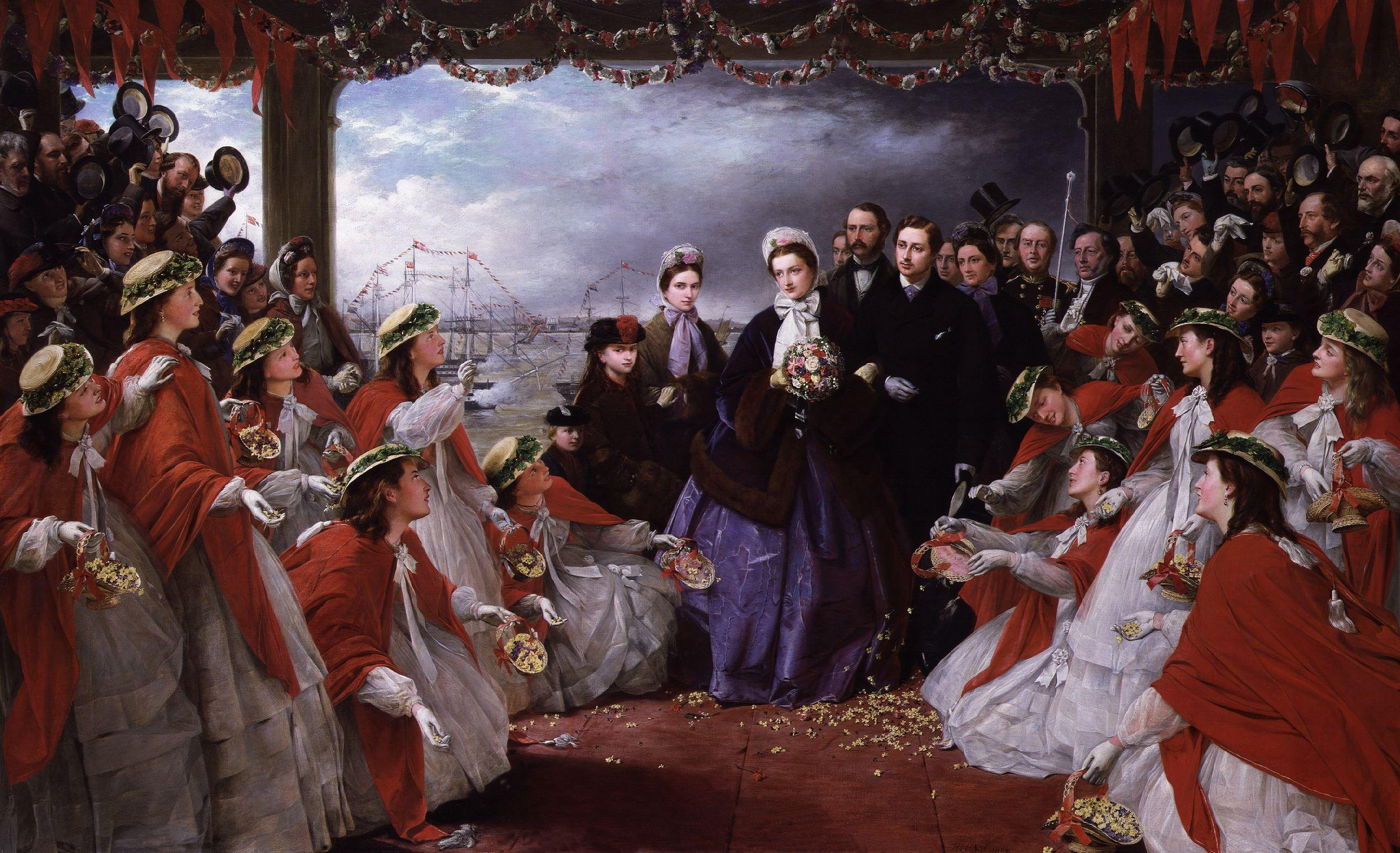
The Landing of Princess Alexandra at Gravesend by Henry Nelson O'Neil

The Gravesend Lifeboat Station moved to the pontoon at the end of the Royal Terrace Pier in June 2007.

The Royal Terrace Pier Estate Company Limited was incorporated 29 June 1893 and dissolved 5 December 2012.
