= London Bridge on the Night of the Marriage of the Prince and Princess of Wales =

1864 painting by William Holman Hunt

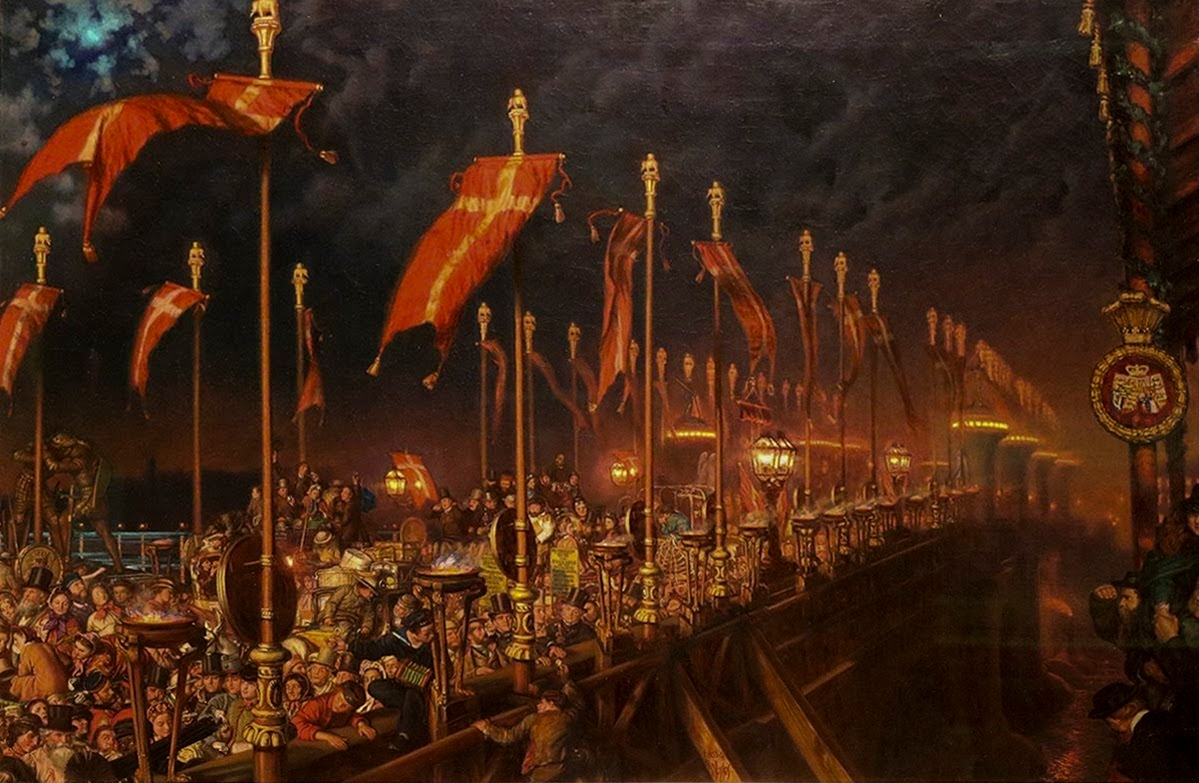
- Artist: William Holman Hunt
- Year: 1864
- Type: Oil on canvas
- Dimensions: 65 cm × 98 cm (26 in × 39 in)
- Location: Ashmolean Museum; Oxford

London Bridge on the Night of the Marriage of the Prince and Princess of Wales is an 1864 painting by the English Pre-Raphaelite artist William Holman Hunt. It depicts a crowd scene on London Bridge on the night of the 10 March 1863, after the Wedding of Prince Albert Edward and Princess Alexandra at Windsor Castle earlier in the day. The bridge is shown festooned with Danish flags in honour of Princess Alexandra, who had married Queen Victoria's eldest son and heir. Hunt was fascinated by the contrast of artificial and natural light as well as the "Hogarthian humour" of the crowds.

It is now part of the collection at the Ashmolean Museum in Oxford.

== See also ==
- The Marriage of the Prince of Wales, 1865 painting by William Powell Frith depicting the wedding ceremony

== Bibliography ==
- Allen, Rick. The Moving Pageant: A Literary Sourcebook on London Street Life, 1700-1914. Routledge, 2006.
- Charles, Victoria. Art in Europe. Parkstone International, 2014.
- Dyos, Harold James & Wolff, Michael . The Victorian City: Images and Realities, Volume 2. Taylor & Francis, 1999.
