= The Marriage of Queen Victoria =

1842 painting by George Hayter

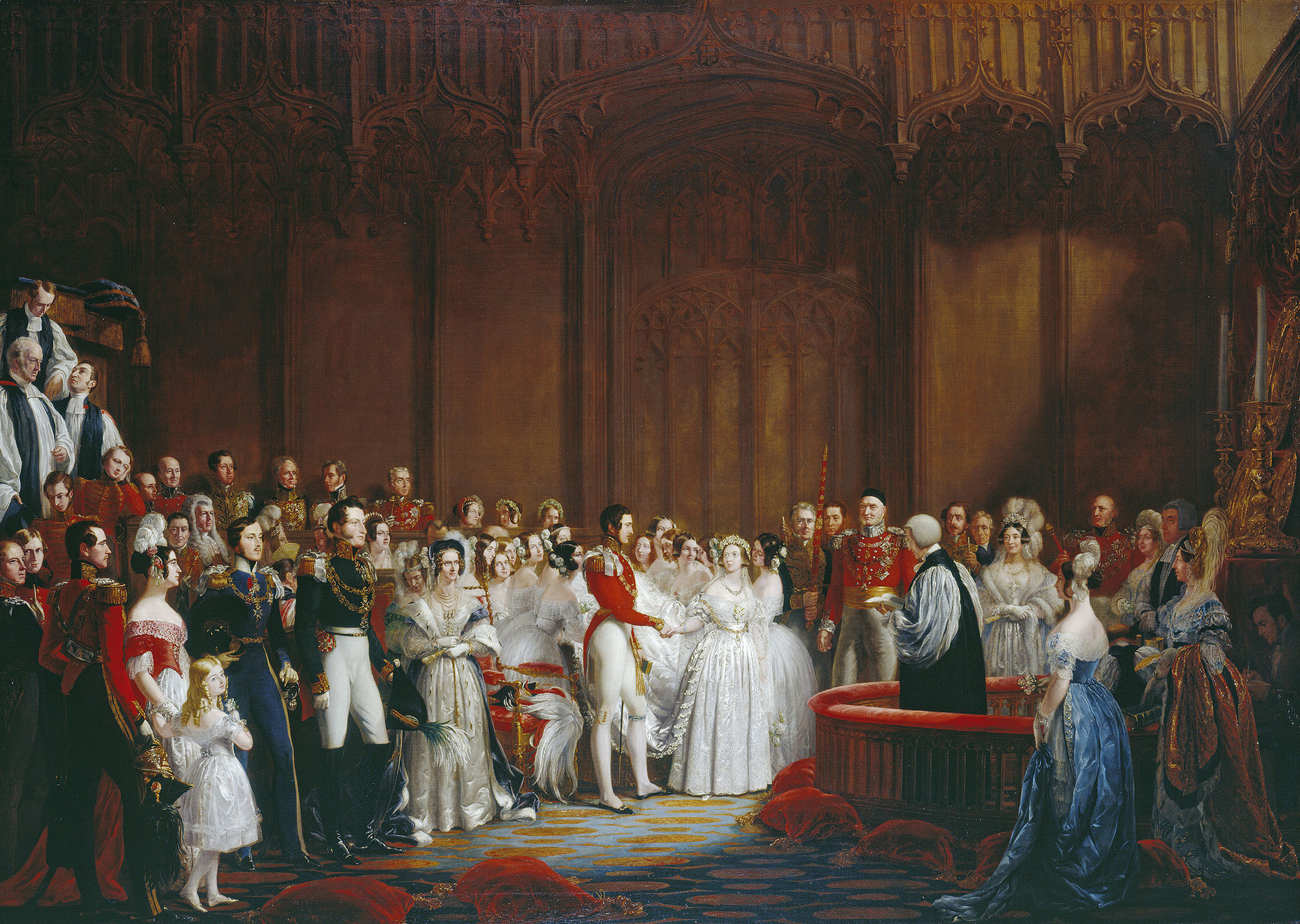
- Artist: George Hayter
- Year: 1842
- Type: Oil on canvas, historical painting
- Dimensions: 195.8 cm × 273.5 cm (77.1 in × 107.7 in)
- Location: East Gallery, Buckingham Palace, London

The Marriage of Queen Victoria is an 1842 painting by the British artist George Hayter. It depicts the wedding between Queen Victoria, reigning monarch of the United Kingdom, and her prince consort Albert on 10 February 1840 at the Chapel Royal in St James's Palace in London.

Hayter had developed his reputation as a portrayer of important scenes of public life with his The Trial of Queen Caroline, exhibited in 1823. His later 1839 painting The Coronation of Queen Victoria depicted the 1838 coronation of the young Queen. In 1841 he was appointed Principal Painter in Ordinary by Victoria.

As with his earlier works, Hayter took a great deal of time painting individual portraits of the various participants. Amongst those depicted besides Victoria and Albert are the former Prime Minister the Duke of Wellington, the Archbishop of Canterbury, the Archbishop of York, the Duchess of Cambridge and the dowager Queen Adelaide. The work features fifty six individual portraits, most of whom sat for Hayter between 1840 and 1842 with the notable exception of Adelaide who he drew from a miniature depicting her. He also featured a self-portrait of himself in the bottom right corner. Today the work is part of the Royal Collection and is displayed at Buckingham Palace.

Hayter followed this with another painting The Christening of the Prince of Wales depicting the ceremony featuring the future Edward VII, completed in 1845. He began the work while he was still completing the wedding painting.

== See also ==
- The Marriage of the Prince of Wales, 1865 painting by William Powell Frith depicting the wedding of Victoria's son

== Bibliography ==
- Chilvers, Ian. The Oxford Dictionary of Art and Artists. Oxford University Press, 2015.
- Plunkett, John. Queen Victoria: First Media Monarch. Oxford University Press, 2003.
- Roberts, Jane. Master Drawings in the Royal Collection: From Leonardo Da Vinci to the Present Day. Collins Harvill, 1986.
