= The Trial of Queen Caroline =

Painting by George Hayter

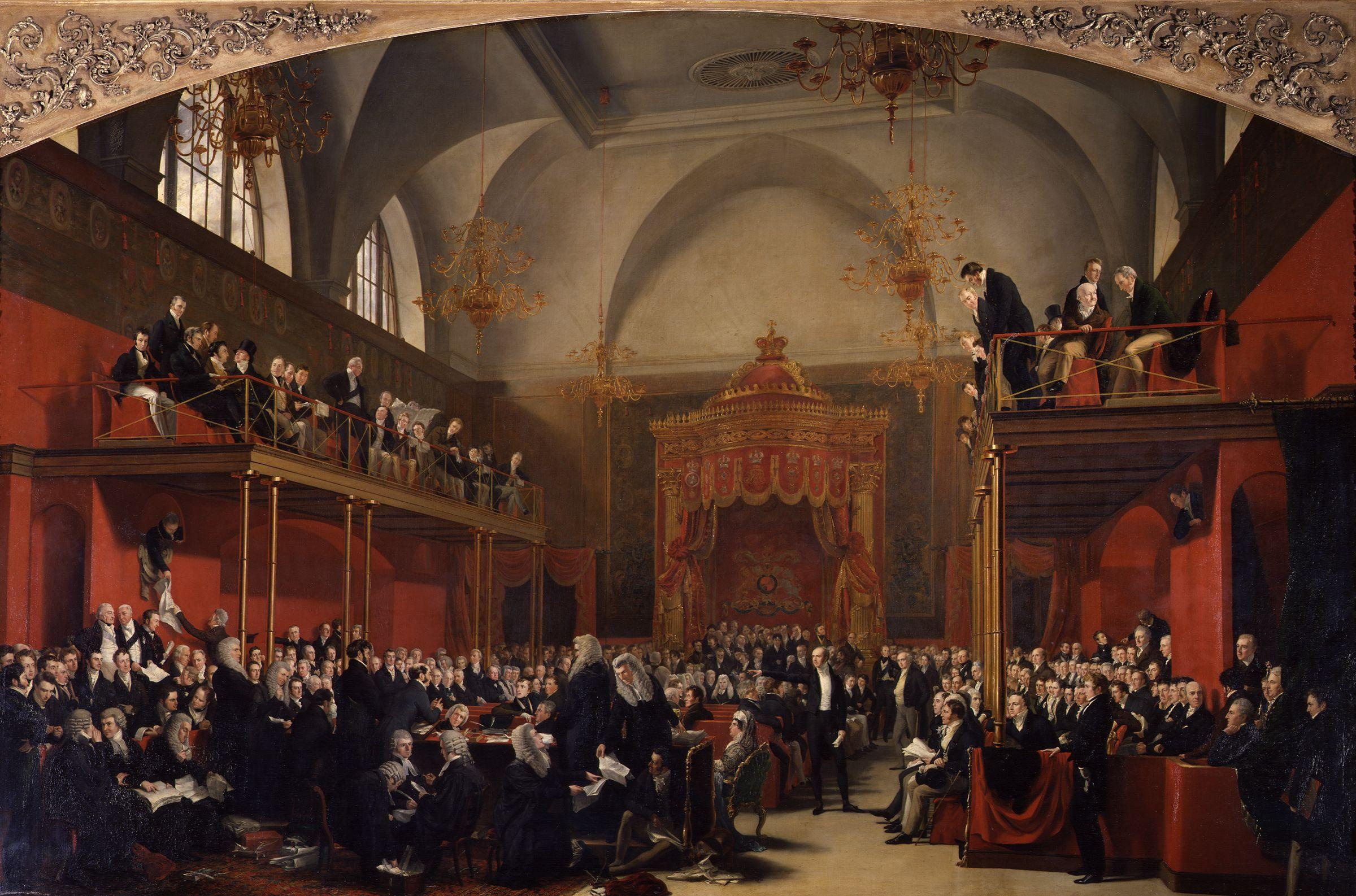
- Artist: George Hayter
- Year: 1823
- Type: Oil on canvas
- Dimensions: 233 cm × 356.2 cm (92 in × 140.2 in)
- Location: National Portrait Gallery, London

The Trial of Queen Caroline is an 1823 history painting by the British artist George Hayter. It depicts the events of 1820, in which George IV, who had recently succeeded to the throne, attempted to divorce his long-estranged wife, Caroline of Brunswick. In order to secure his divorce, George had a special bill moved in the House of Lords. The Lords heard evidence of the Queen's adultery, but with public opinion strongly in Caroline's favour, the measure was ultimately withdrawn by the government. Caroline remained married to George until her death the following year.

== Persons portrayed ==
The painting was commissioned by George Agar-Ellis, a rising young Whig Member of Parliament and supporter of Caroline. It depicts the sixth day of the proceedings. Caroline herself is seated near the front center of the picture facing sideways. Amongst those prominent in the picture are the Whig opposition politicians Lord Holland and Earl Grey, with the latter standing and cross-examining a witness. Amongst the large crowd are the current Prime Minister Lord Liverpool, in addition to the government ministers the Duke of Wellington and Lord Castlereagh, along with former or future prime ministers William Grenville, Henry Addington, Lord John Russell, and Lord Melbourne. Also included are two of the King's brothers: the Duke of York and the Duke of Clarence, the future William IV. Agar-Ellis appears prominently on the right of the painting, and in the bottom right hand corner is a self-portrait of the artist.

== Exhibitions ==
It was exhibited at Cauty's Great Rooms at Schomberg House in Pall Mall in 1823. Hayter went on to produce several contemporary history paintings, including The House of Commons, 1833, as well as the Coronation and Wedding of Queen Victoria. It is now part of the collection of the National Portrait Gallery in London, following a 1912 gift by the Art Fund.

== See also ==
- The Trial of William Lord Russell, 1825
- The Coronation of Queen Victoria, 1839
- The Marriage of Queen Victoria, 1842

== Bibliography ==
- Arnold, Dana. Squanderous and Lavish Profusion: George IV, His Image and Patronage of the Arts. Georgian Group, 1995.
- Duff, David (ed.) The Oxford Handbook of British Romanticism. Oxford University Press, 2018.
- Perry, Lara. History's Beauties: Women in the National Portrait Gallery, 1856-1900. Ashgate Publishing, 2006.
- Robins, Jane. The Trial of Queen Caroline: The Scandalous Affair that Nearly Ended a Monarchy. Simon and Schuster, 2006.
- Thompson, Jason. Queen Caroline and Sir William Gell: A Study in Royal Patronage and Classical Scholarship. Springer, 2018.
