= The Marriage of the Prince of Wales =

1865 painting by William Powell Frith

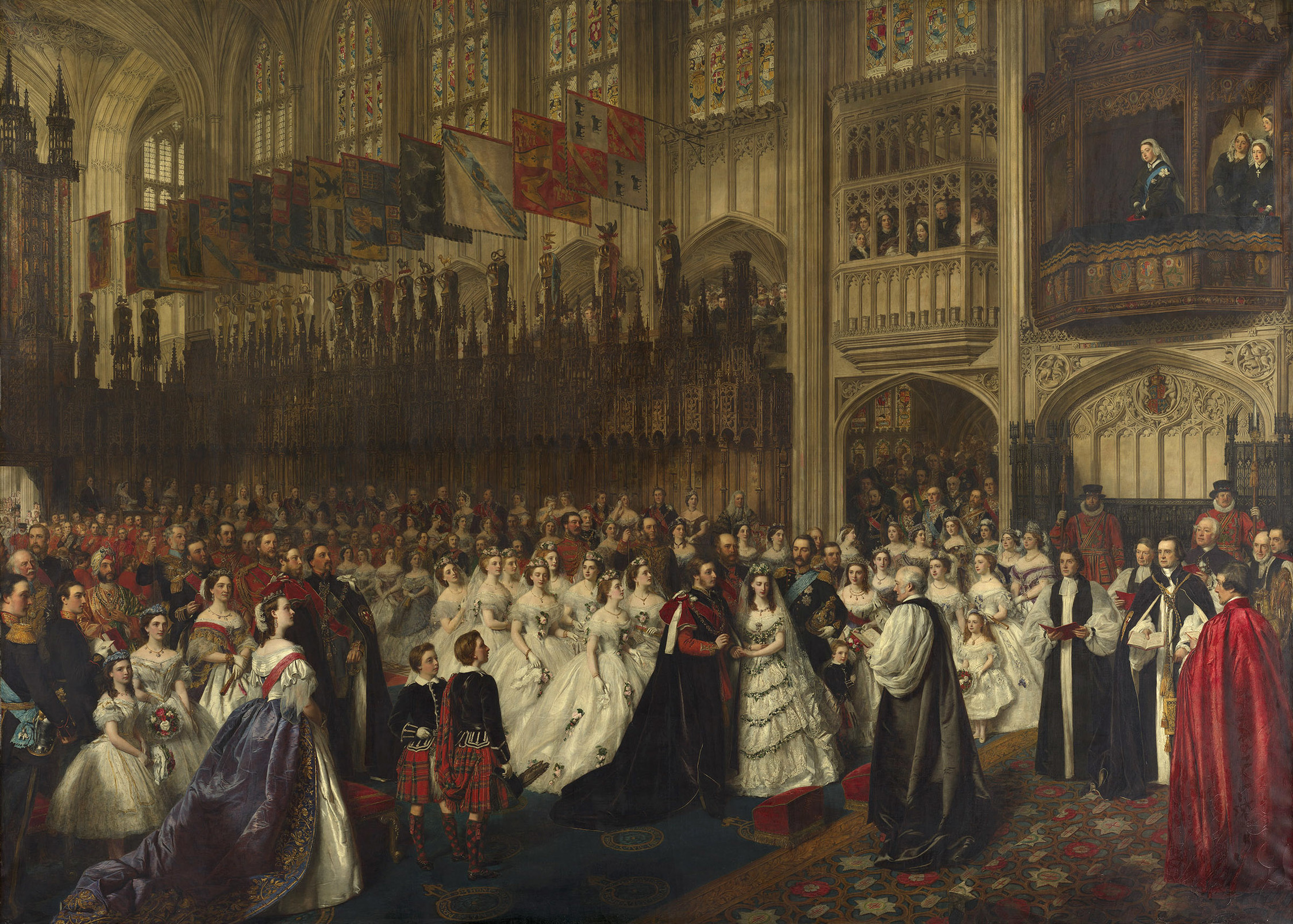
- Artist: William Powell Frith
- Year: 1863–1865
- Type: Oil on canvas, historical painting
- Dimensions: 222.7 cm × 309.8 cm (87.7 in × 122.0 in)
- Location: Royal Collection

The Marriage of the Prince of Wales is a painting by the British artist William Powell Frith, created in 1863-1865. It is held in the Royal Collection in London and as of July 2024 hangs in the Principal Corridor at Buckingham Palace.

== Description ==
The painting depicts the marriage between the Prince of Wales, the future Edward VII, and his Danish bride Princess Alexandra on 10 March 1863. The wedding took place at St George's Chapel in Windsor Castle. Queen Victoria is visible on a balcony in the top right hand corner of the scene, in mourning clothes after the death of her consort Prince Albert two years before; the two boys in tartan in the foreground are her youngest sons Prince Arthur and Prince Leopold. Other figures in the painting include Charles Longley, the Archbishop of Canterbury who performed the ceremony, and the Princess Royal.

== History ==
Frith was known for his paintings of crowd scenes, notably The Derby Day and The Railway Station. He was commissioned by Queen Victoria to paint the event and attended the ceremony to sketch the scene, also working from photographs taken on the day (which he described as a "most unsatisfactory process"), sittings with some participants and copying clothes and jewels that had been worn. He completed the painting in 1865, when it was exhibited at the Royal Academy's Summer Exhibition. Frith was paid a fee of £3,000 for the painting, while the art dealer Louis Flatow bought the copyright for £5,000. In 1875 The Marriage of the Prince of Wales was in the Music Room at Buckingham Palace.

== See also ==
- The Marriage of Queen Victoria, a painting by George Hayter depicting Queen Victoria's 1840 wedding
- London Bridge on the Night of the Marriage of the Prince and Princess of Wales, a painting by William Holman Hunt of London celebrations of the wedding
- The Landing of Princess Alexandra at Gravesend by Henry Nelson O'Neil

== Bibliography ==
- Maas, Jeremy. The Prince of Wales's Wedding: The Story of a Picture. London: Cameron & Tayleur, 1977. ISBN 9780715374191.
- Bills, Mark and Vivien Knight, eds. William Powell Frith: Painting the Victorian Age. New Haven, Connecticut: Yale University Press / Guildhall Art Gallery, City of London, 2006. ISBN 9780300121902.
