= Wedding of Prince Albert Edward and Princess Alexandra =

1863 British royal wedding

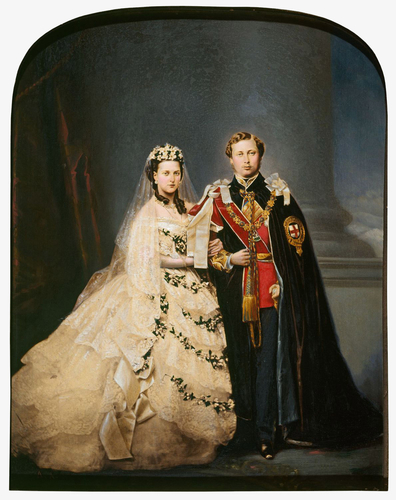
- Prince Albert Edward and Princess Alexandra on their wedding day, 1863
- Date: 10 March 1863; 163 years ago
- Venue: St. George's Chapel, Windsor Castle
- Location: Windsor, England
- Participants: Albert Edward, Prince of Wales (later King Edward VII); Princess Alexandra of Denmark (later Queen Alexandra)

The wedding of Albert Edward, Prince of Wales (later King Edward VII), and Princess Alexandra of Denmark (later Queen Alexandra) took place on 10 March 1863 at St. George's Chapel, Windsor Castle. It was the first royal wedding to take place at St. George's, and the last wedding of a Prince of Wales until Prince Charles and Lady Diana Spencer's 1981 wedding.

== Engagement ==
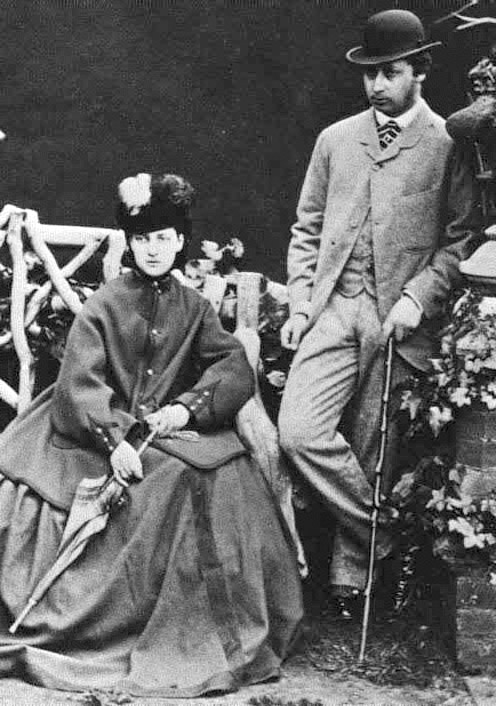
Princess Alexandra of Denmark and the Prince of Wales, 1863

Before his marriage, Prince Albert Edward, known as "Bertie" amongst his family, garnered a reputation as a philandering prince, and his irresponsibility was greatly detested by his parents, Queen Victoria and Prince Albert. They sought to put a stop to his affairs by means of marriage and thereby bring stability to his life. In 1858, the Queen and Prince Albert began the process of finding their son a suitable bride, preferably a German Protestant. The Prince's older sister, Victoria, Princess Royal (by then Crown Princess of Prussia), aided the Queen in drafting a list of potential brides, the fifth on the list being the thirteen-year-old Princess Alexandra of Denmark, the eldest daughter of Prince Christian of Schleswig-Holstein-Sonderburg-Beck (later King Christian IX of Denmark) and Louise of Hesse-Kassel. In the end, Bertie's father agreed on Alexandra, remarking that she was "the only one to be chosen." Prince Albert Edward and Princess Alexandra met on 24 September 1861 at Speyer Cathedral, Germany, an arrangement engineered by Princess Victoria.

On 14 December that year, Prince Albert died of typhoid, causing the Queen to enter a deep state of mourning. She blamed his death on their son and his promiscuous affairs, most recently with actress Nellie Clifden that caused a rift between Bertie and his father. Perhaps to appease his mother by following the late Prince Consort's wishes, Bertie proposed to Alexandra on their next meeting. They were engaged on 9 September 1862 at the Palace of Laeken, Belgium.

Princess Alexandra arrived in Britain abroad the royal yacht Victoria and Albert on 7 March 1863, just a few months after the engagement. She was received by large crowds as she landed in Gravesend, Kent. She joined the Prince of Wales on the royal train for the journey to London, where she was greeted by an anxious Queen Victoria.

== Wedding ==
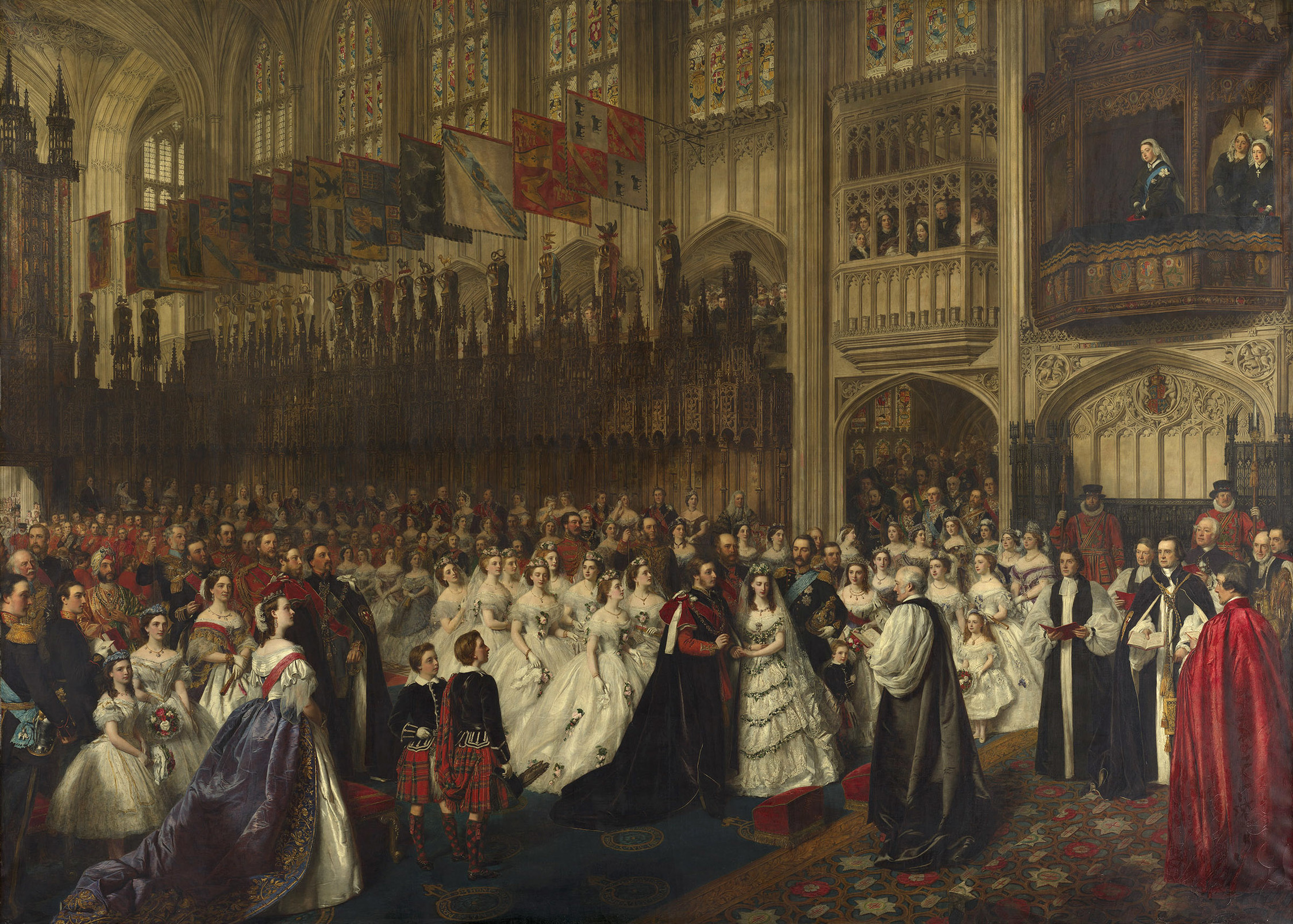
The Marriage of the Prince of Wales by William Powell Frith, 1865.

The Queen decided that the ceremony would be held at St. George Chapel, Windsor, at the time an unusual location as royal weddings typically took place in London. The press complained that public spectators would not be able to view the event, and many who expected invitations were disappointed. Only Princess Alexandra's close family were invited.

On the morning of 10 March 1863, the carriage procession began from Windsor Castle. The Danish royal family led, followed by the British royal family; the Prince of Wales and his entourage were in the penultimate carriage, followed by the bride. Queen Victoria was not in the procession, being taken to the chapel privately. She was escorted by her brother-in-law, the Duke of Saxe-Coburg and Gotha, dressed in mourning, and viewed the ceremony from above. The ceremony was conducted by Thomas Longley, the Archbishop of Canterbury.

Combined coat of arms of Albert Edward and Alexandra, the Prince and Princess of Wales

Princess Alexandra was attended by eight bridesmaids Diana Beauclerk, Victoria Montagu-Douglas-Scott, Victoria Howard, Elma Bruce, Agneta Yorke, Emily Villiers (filling in for Hariot Georgina Hamilton-Rowan who was indisposed that day), Eleanor Hare and Feodorowna Wellesley. She was supported by her father, Prince Christian, and by the Duke of Cambridge. The Prince of Wales was supported by his uncle, the Duke of Saxe-Coburg and Gotha, and brother-in-law, the Crown Prince of Prussia.

After the ceremony, the Prince and Princess of Wales returned to Windsor Castle along with the other guests. Many of the royal guests served as witnesses, with Queen Victoria, the Prince of Wales's siblings and their spouses, Princess Alexandra's family, as well as the Danish and British ministers and Lord Chancellor signing the marriage register. A banquet was held in the State Dining Room for the royal guests and in St. George's Hall for household members, and other guests. The couple honeymooned at Osborne House on the Isle of Wight.

Following her marriage, Princess Alexandra was styled Her Royal Highness The Princess of Wales.

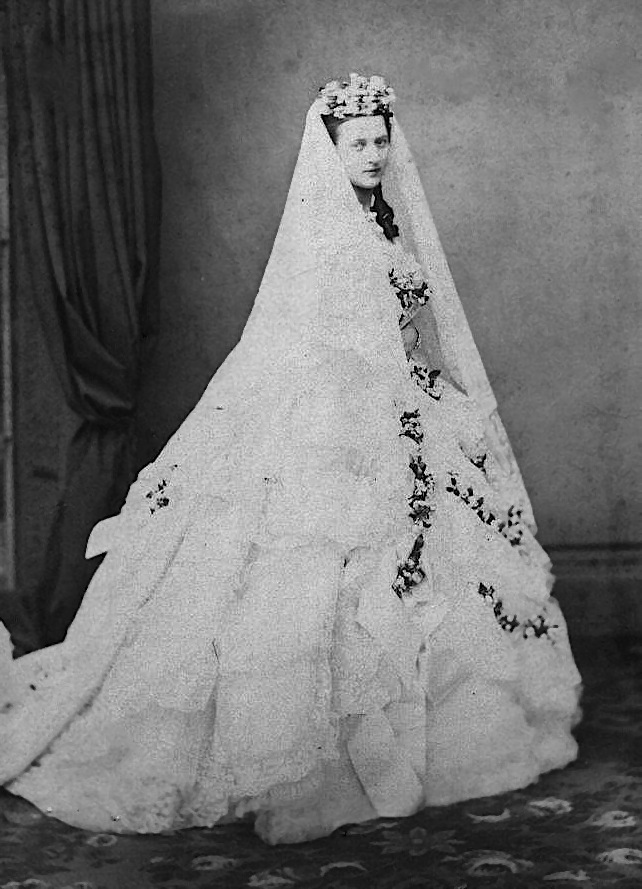
Princess Alexandra of Denmark, in her wedding dress (10 March 1863)

=== Wedding Gown ===
Princess Alexandra's dress was made of white silk, tulle, and lace with garlands of orange blossoms and myrtle. It had a 21 foot train and was the first British royal wedding gown photographed while being worn.

== Guests ==
=== Groom's family ===
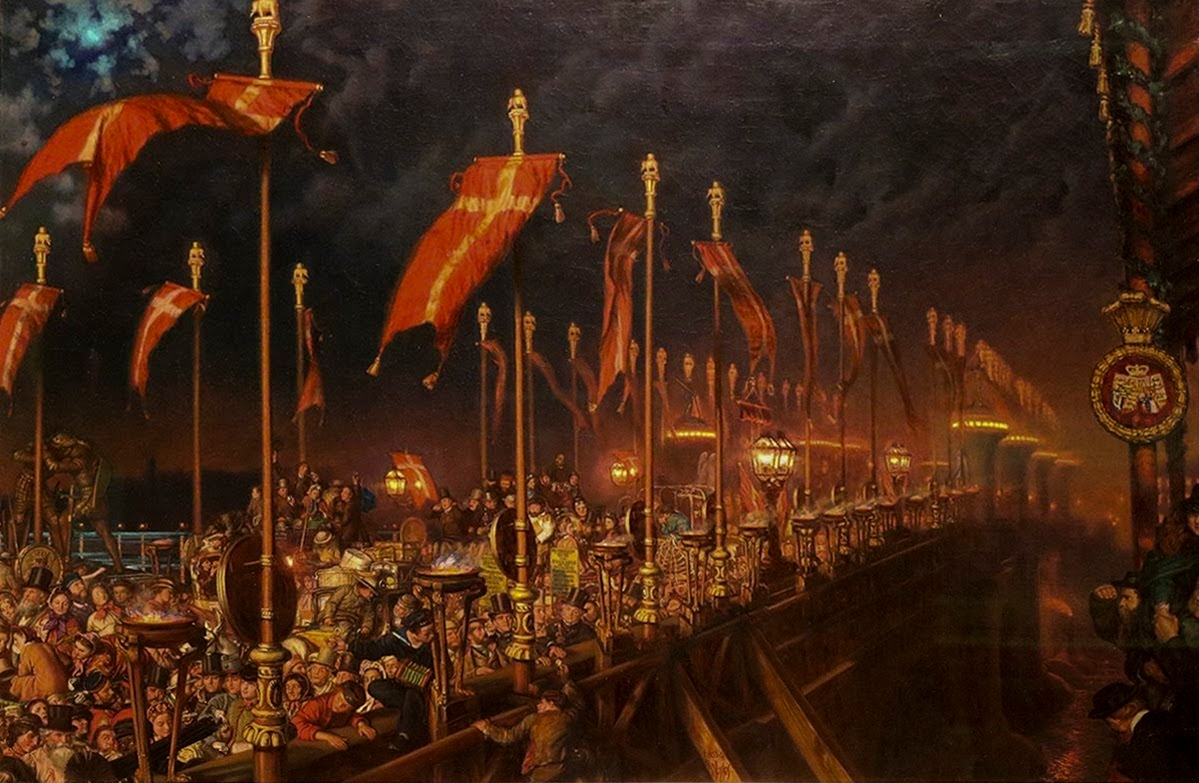
London Bridge on the Night of the Marriage of the Prince and Princess of Wales by William Holman Hunt, 1864. Hunt depicted the popular celebrations on London Bridge.

- The Queen, the groom's mother
  - (Kingdom of Prussia) The Crown Princess and Crown Prince of Prussia, the groom's sister and brother-in-law
    - (Kingdom of Prussia) Prince Wilhelm of Prussia, the groom's nephew
  - (Grand Duchy of Hesse) Princess and Prince Ludwig of Hesse and by Rhine, the groom's sister and brother-in-law
  - The Princess Helena, the groom's sister
  - The Princess Louise, the groom's sister
  - The Prince Arthur, the groom's brother
  - The Prince Leopold, the groom's brother
  - The Princess Beatrice, the groom's sister
- The Duke of Saxe-Coburg and Gotha, the groom's paternal uncle
- The Duchess of Inverness, the groom's maternal grandaunt by marriage
- The Duchess of Cambridge, the groom's maternal grandaunt by marriage
  - The Duke of Cambridge, the groom's maternal first cousin once removed
  - Princess Mary Adelaide of Cambridge, the groom's maternal first cousin once removed
- The Prince of Leiningen, the groom's maternal first half-cousin
- Count and Countess von Gleichen, the groom's maternal first half-cousin and his wife
- (Belgium) The Duchess of Brabant, wife of the groom's double first cousin once removed
- (Belgium) The Count of Flanders, the groom's double first cousin once removed
- Prince August of Saxe-Coburg and Gotha, the groom's double first cousin once removed

=== Bride's family ===
- Prince and Princess Christian of Denmark, the bride's parents
  - Prince Frederick of Denmark, the bride's brother
  - Prince Wilhelm of Denmark, the bride's brother
  - Princess Dagmar of Denmark, the bride's sister
  - Princess Thyra of Denmark, the bride's sister
- The Duke of Schleswig-Holstein-Sonderburg-Glücksburg, the bride's paternal uncle
- Prince Frederick William of Hesse-Kassel, the bride's maternal uncle

=== Other royals ===
- (Saxe-Weimar-Eisenach) Prince Edward of Saxe-Weimar
- Maharaja Sir Duleep Singh

=== Foreign ambassadors ===
- (Ottoman Empire) The Ottoman Ambassador and Madame Mousouros
- (Austrian Empire) The Austrian Ambassador and Countess Apponyi
- (Russian Empire) The Russian Ambassador and Baroness von Brunnow
- (Kingdom of Prussia) The Prussian Ambassador and Countess von Bernstorff
- (Second French Empire) The French Ambassador
- (Belgium) The Belgian Minister and Madame Van De Weyer
- (Kingdom of Bavaria) The Bavarian Minister
- (Kingdom of Hanover) The Hanoverian Minister
- (Duchy of Savoy) The Italian Minister
- (Netherlands) The Dutch Minister
- (Kingdom of Portugal) The Portuguese Minister
- (Empire of Brazil) The Brazilian Minister and Madame Moreira
- (Kingdom of Saxony) The Saxon Minster
- (Denmark) The Danish Minister
- (Honduras) The Honduran Minister
- The United States Minister and Mrs. Adams
- (Union between Sweden and Norway) The Swedish Minister
- (Spain) The Spanish Minister
- (Peru) The Peruvian Minister
- (Pahlavi dynasty) The Persian Minister
- (Kingdom of Greece) The Greek Chargé d'affaires
- (Haiti) The Haitian Chargé d'affaires

=== Royal household ===
- The Lord Steward
- The Lord Chamberlain and the Viscountess Sidney
- The Master of the Horse and the Marchioness of Ailesbury
- The Mistress of the Robes
- The Treasurer of the Household and Viscountess Bury
- The Comptroller of the Household and Lady Proby
- The Vice Chamberlain and Viscountess Castlerosse
- The Captain of the Yeomen of the Guard and the Countess of Ducie
- The Gold Stick in Waiting and Viscountess Combermere
- The Keeper of the Privy Purse and the Hon. Lady Phipps
- The Master of the Buckhounds and the Countess of Bessborough
- The Deputy Earl Marshall
- The Master of the Household and the Hon. Mrs. Biddulph
- The Lord in Waiting
- The Groom in Waiting
- The Clerk Marshal
- The Groom of the Stool and the Countess Spencer
- The Lord Chamberlain to the Princess of Wales

=== Clergy ===
- The Archbishop of Canterbury
- The Bishop of London and Catharine Tait
- The Bishop of Winchester
- The Bishop of Oxford
- The Bishop of Chester and Mrs. Graham
- The Dean of Windsor and the Hon. Mrs. Wellesley

=== Politicians ===
- The Lord High Chancellor
- The Lord President of the Council
- The Lord Privy Seal and the Duchess of Argyll
- The Prime Minister and First Lord of the Treasury, and the Viscountess Palmerston
- The Chancellor of the Exchequer and Mrs Gladstone
- The Secretary of State for Foreign Affairs and the Countess Russell
- The Secretary of State for the Colonies
- The Secretary of State for the Home Department and Lady Grey
- The Secretary of State for India and Lady Mary Wood
- The Secretary of State for War
- The First Lord of the Admiralty and the Duchess of Somerset
- The President of the Board of Trade
- The Postmaster General and the Lady Stanley of Alderley
- The Chancellor of the Duchy of Lancaster and Mrs. Cardwell
- The President of the Poor Law Board
- The First Commissioner of Works and the Hon. Mrs. William Cooper
- The Vice-President of the Committee of the Council on Education and Mrs. Lowe
- The Vice-President of the Board of Trade and Mrs. Hutt
- The Chief Secretary for Ireland
- The Speaker of the House of Commons and Lady Charlotte Denison
- The Lord Chief Justice of the Queen's Bench
- The Judge Advocate General and Mrs. Headlam
- The Adjutant General
- The Quartermaster General
- The Lord Mayor and Lord Mayoress of London
- The Gentleman Usher of the Black Rod
- Mr and Mrs. Benjamin Disraeli

=== Nobles ===
- The Duke and Duchess of Buccleuch
- The Duke of Devonshire
- The Duke of St Albans
- The Dowager Duchess of Sutherland
- The Duke and Duchess of Atholl
- Marquess and Marchioness of Carmarthen
- The Marquess and Marchioness of Salisbury
- The Marquess Camden
- The Marquess and Marchioness of Abercorn
  - Viscount Hamilton
- The Marquess and Marchioness of Westminster
- The Marchioness of Ely
- The Dowager Countess of Mount Edgcumbe
  - The Earl and Countess of Mount Edgcumbe
- The Earl and Countess of Clarendon
- The Earl and Countess of Suffolk
- The Earl and Countess of Hardwicke
- The Earl and Countess Cowley
- The Earl and Countess of Macclesfield
- The Earl and Countess of Morton
- The Earl and Countess de Grey and Ripon
- The Earl of Carlisle
- The Earl of Harrowby
- The Countess of Derby
- The Earl and Countess of Shaftesbury
- The Earl and Countess Fitzwilliam
- The Earl and Countess De La Warr
- The Earl and Countess of Caithness
- The Viscount and Viscountess Falkland
- The Countess of Dysart
- Viscount Hinchingbrooke
- Viscountess Jocelyn
- Viscountess Chewton
- Viscountess Forbes
- The Viscount and Viscountess Torrington
- The Lord Portman
- The Lord and Lady Churchill
- The Dowager Lady Lyttelton
- The Lord and Lady Camoys
- The Lord Rivers
- The Lord Methuen
- The Lord and Lady de Tabley
- The Lord and Lady Cremorne
- The Lady Byron
- Lord and Lady Alfred Harvey
- Lord Charles FitzRoy
- Francis and Lady Emily Seymour
- The Hon. Dudley and Lady Elizabet de Ros
- Sir William Alexander, 3rd Baronet
- Sir Alexander Cornewall Duff-Gordon, 3rd Baronet
- Sir William Dunbar, 7th Baronet and Lady Dunbar
- Sir James Clark, 1st Baronet
- The Garter Principal King of Arms

== Bibliography ==
- Battiscombe, Georgina (1969). Queen Alexandra. London: Constable. ISBN 0-09-456560-0. OCLC 44849.
- Bentley-Cranch, Dana (1992). Edward VII : image of an era, 1841-1910. London: Her Majesty's Stationery Office. ISBN 0-11-290508-0. OCLC 26997839.
- Duff, David (1980), Alexandra: Princess and Queen, London: Colins, ISBN 0-00-216667-4
- Hibbert, Christopher (2000), Queen Victoria: A Personal History, London: HarperCollins, ISBN 0-00-638843-4
- Marshall, Elizabeth (1972), The Life and Times of Queen Victoria (1992 reprint ed.), London: Weidenfeld & Nicolson, ISBN 0-297-83166-6
- St. Aubyn, Giles (1991), Queen Victoria: A Portrait, London: Sinclair-Stevenson, ISBN 1-85619-086-2
