= The House of Commons, 1833 =

Painting by George Hayter

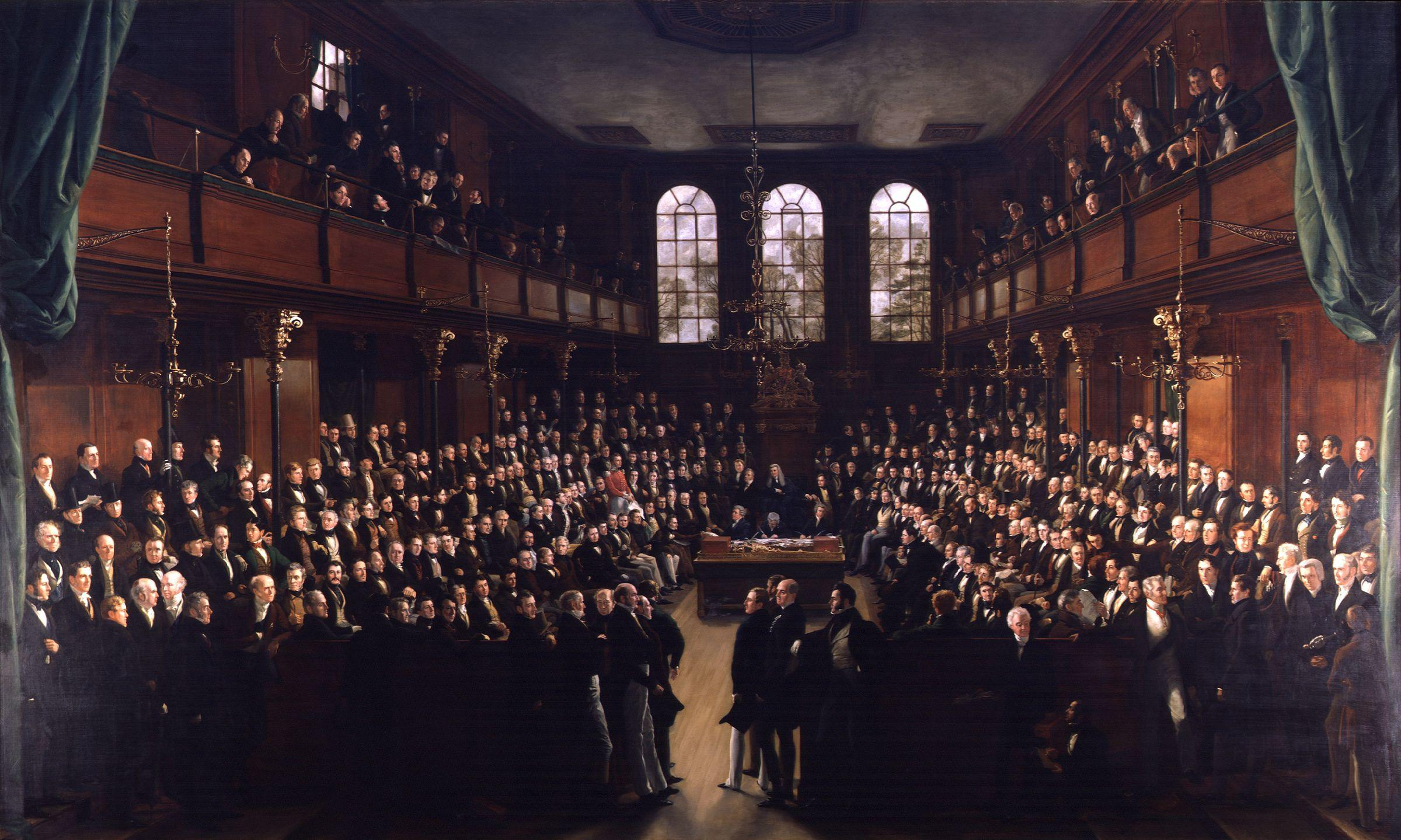
- Artist: George Hayter
- Year: 1843
- Type: Oil on canvas, historical painting
- Dimensions: 346 cm × 542 cm (136 in × 213 in)
- Location: National Portrait Gallery, London

The House of Commons, 1833 is a large history painting by the British artist George Hayter. It depicts the first meeting of the House of Commons following the Reform Act 1832 and the subsequent general election that produced a landslide majority for the ruling Whig Government. In the Victorian era the painting was often known as The First Reformed Parliament.

Hayter began the work in 1833, without any commission and took a decade to complete. It was a further fifteen years before he finally sold it in 1858 to the newly founded National Portrait Gallery. In 1912 the Gallery also acquired what functions as an effective companion piece, Hayter's earlier The Trial of Queen Caroline depicting the House of Lords in 1820.

== Figures portrayed ==
It depicts the old Commons chamber in St Stephen's Chapel before it burned down in 1834. It features many leading politicians of the day including several members of the Lords. Hayter originally planned to depict all 658 members of the new commons, but instead settled on a reduced number of around 375 although he kept a roughly proportionate party balance between Whigs and Tories. A number of Prime Ministers past, present and future are depicted including the current incumbent Lord Grey, the Duke of Wellington, Lord Melbourne, Robert Peel, Lord Aberdeen, Lord Ripon, Lord Palmerston, Lord Derby, Lord John Russell and William Gladstone - a group that covers every Prime Minister from August 1827 and June 1885 with the exception of Benjamin Disraeli who was not elected to Parliament until 1837.

Other notable figures include the Speaker Sir Charles Manners-Sutton, the Irish leader Daniel O'Connell, the historian Thomas Macaulay, the radical leaders Sir Francis Burdett and William Cobbett, the soldier Henry Hardinge, the Whig reformers Lord Holland and Lord Lansdowne and the Ultra-Tory Sir Edward Knatchbull. As he did in several of his works, Hayter added a self-portrait sketching the scene on the lower right of the painting.

== See also ==
- The House of Commons, 1793–94, 1795 work by Anton Hickel
- The Reform Banquet, 1834 painting by Benjamin Robert Haydon

== Bibliography ==
- Campbell, Timothy. Historical Style: Fashion and the New Mode of History, 1740-1830. University of Pennsylvania Press, 2016.
- Carlisle, Janice. Picturing Reform in Victorian Britain. Cambridge University Press, 2012.
- Perry, Lara. History's Beauties: Women in the National Portrait Gallery, 1856-1900. Ashgate Publishing, 2006.
