= Royal Academy Exhibition of 1873 =

1873 art exhibition in London

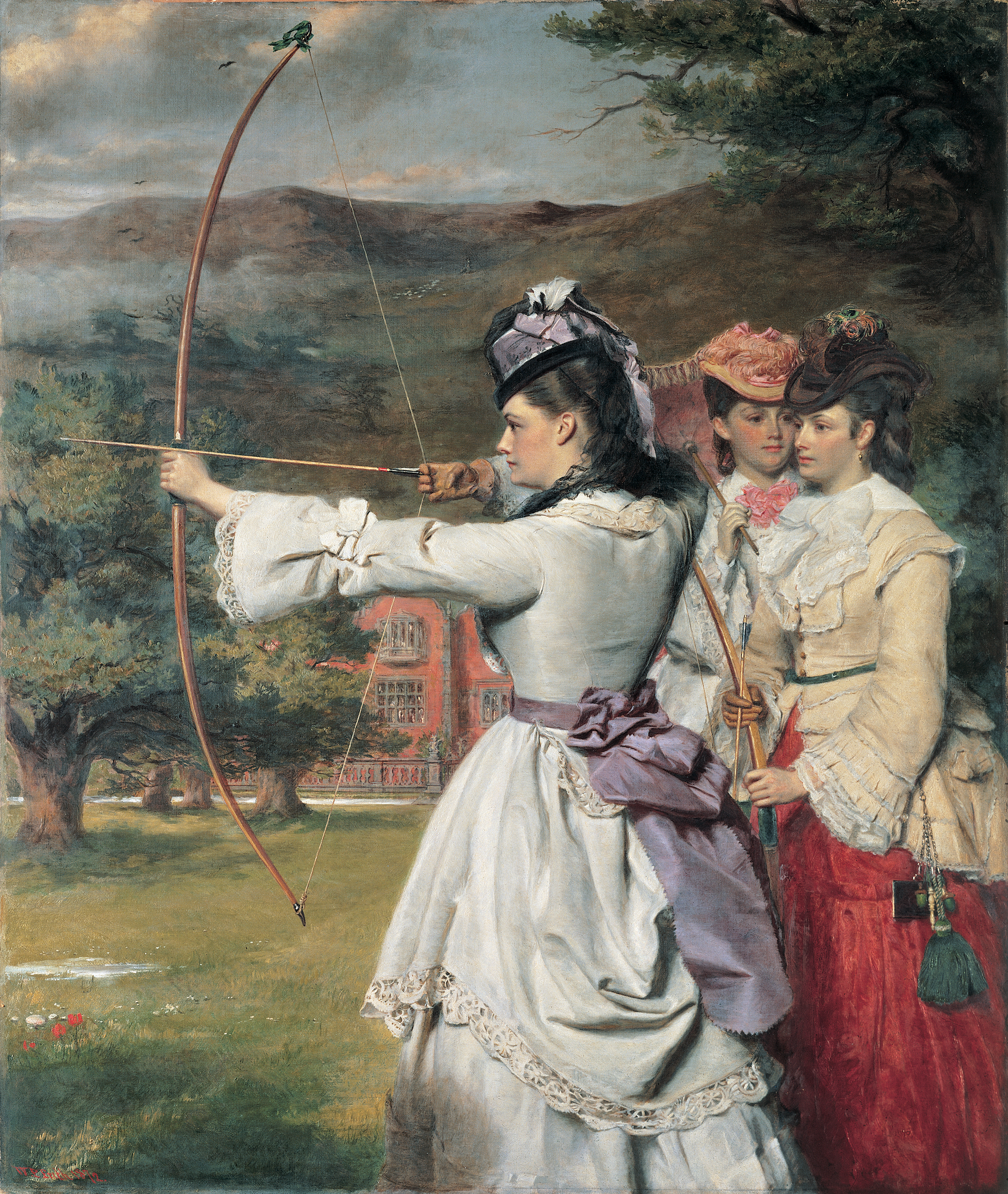
The Fair Toxophilites by William Powell Frith

The Royal Academy Exhibition of 1873 was the hundred and fifth annual Summer Exhibition of the British Royal Academy of Arts. It was held at Burlington House in London's Piccadilly from 5 May to 4 August 1873 and attracted 236,000 visitors. It featured submissions of paintings, sculpture, etchings and architectural drawings from leading artists and architects of the Victorian Era. Francis Grant presided as President of the Royal Academy. Leopold II of Belgium and his wife Marie Henriette attended the private view.

This year's exhibition was noted for the significant number of works displayed by woman, who made up around a tenth of the 900 artists who showcased their work. The Times praised this "very distinguished group" which included Louisa Starr, Martha Darley Mutrie and Anna Maria Charretie. The French artist James Tissot, who had settled in London a couple of years London, attracted attention for the paintings he displayed that combined scenes of everyday life. William Powell Frith exhibited The Fair Toxophilites a painting featuring his three daughters practicing archery. John Everett Millais submitted five pictures that year including three portrait paintings. Elizabeth Thompson exhibited for the first time with Missing, a scene from the Franco-Prussian War.

== Gallery ==
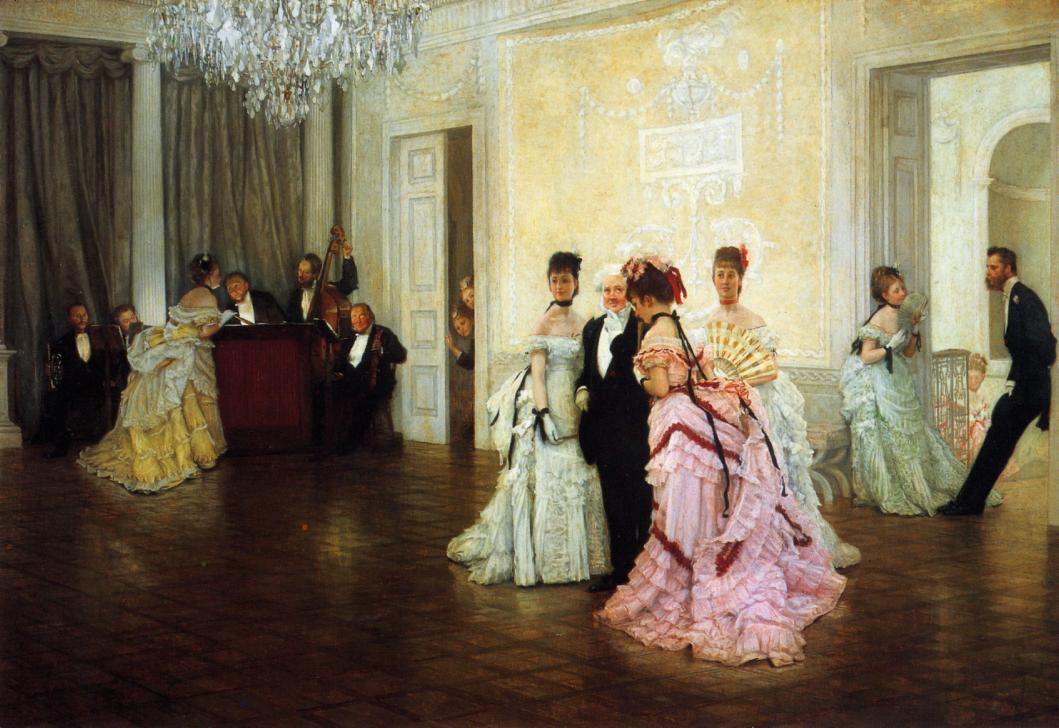
Too Early by James Tissot

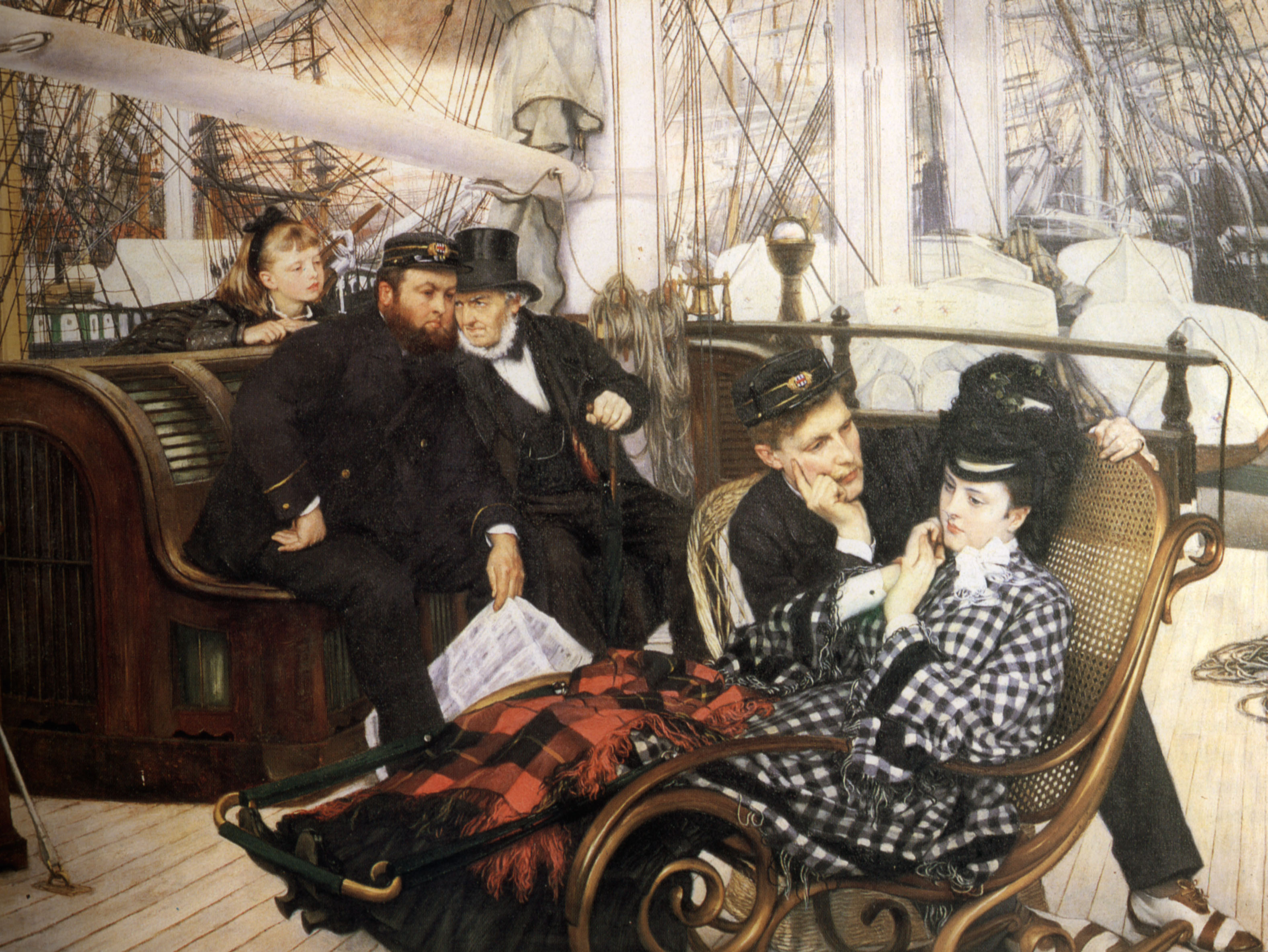
The Last Evening by James Tissot

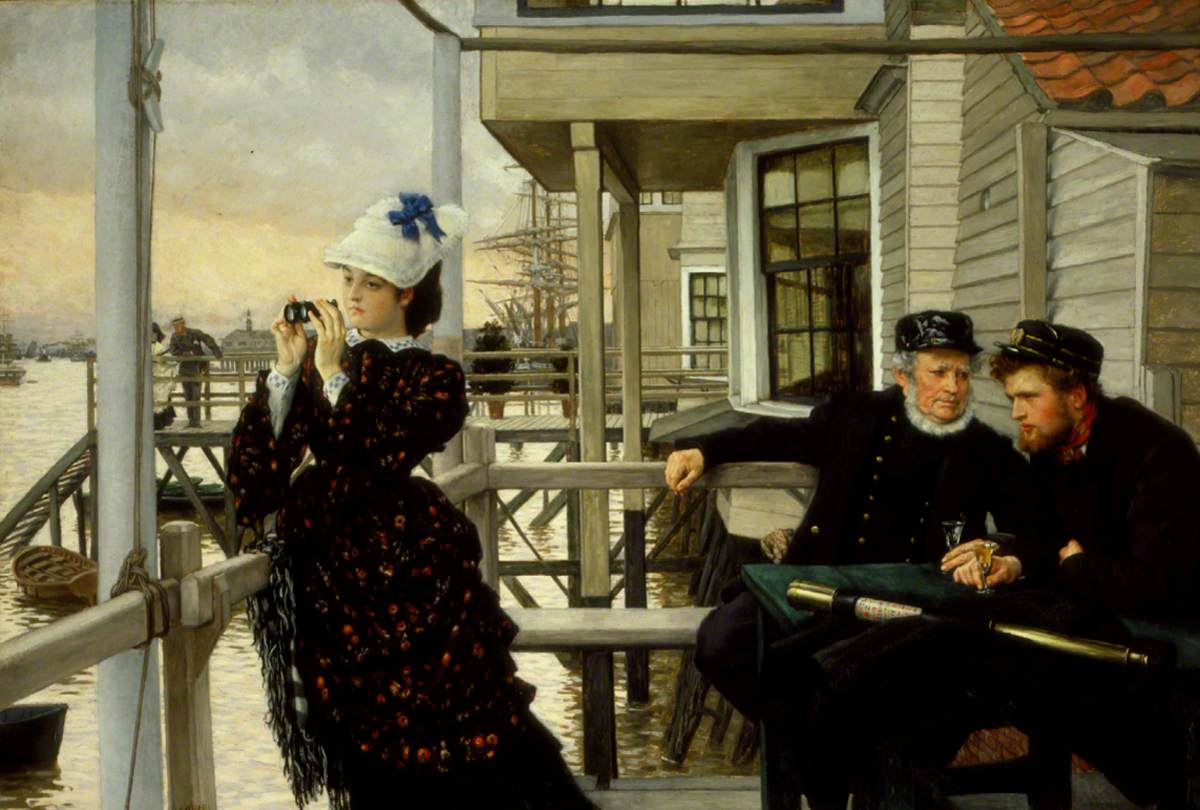
The Captain's Daughter by James Tissot

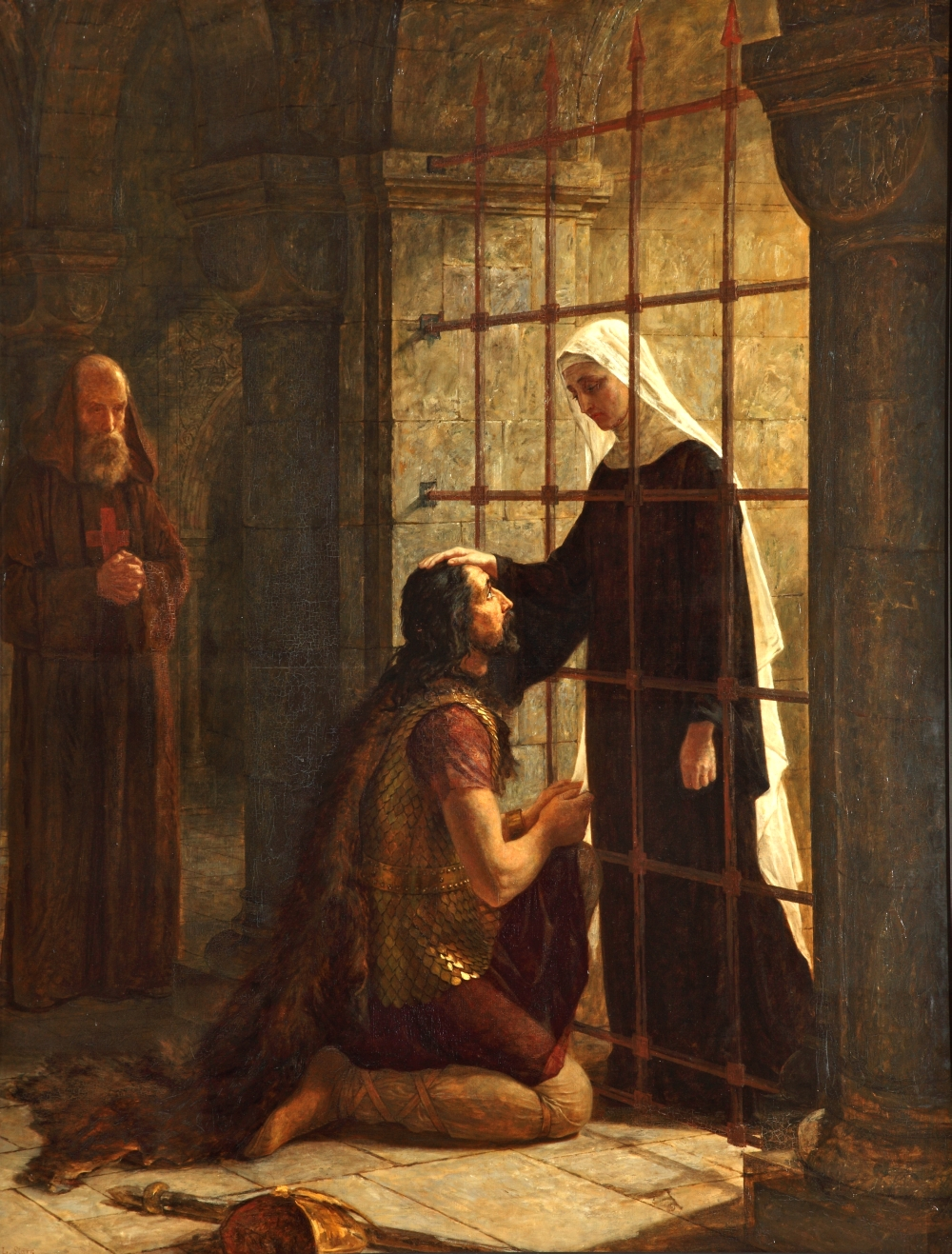
Sintram and His Mother by Louisa Starr

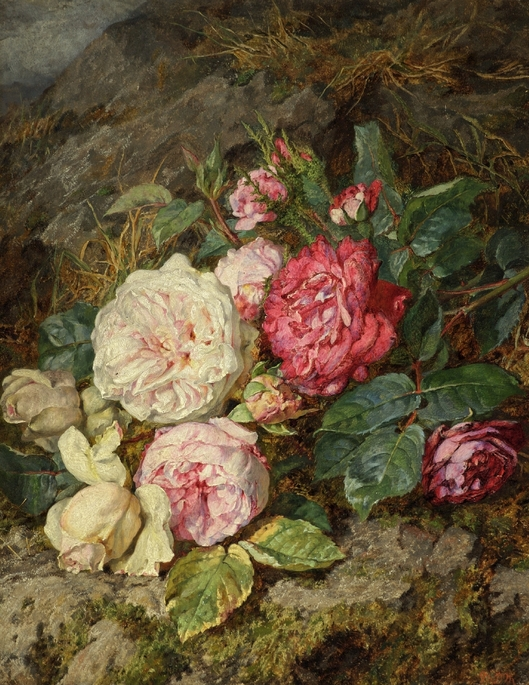
Roses by Martha Darley Mutrie

Early Days by John Everett Millais

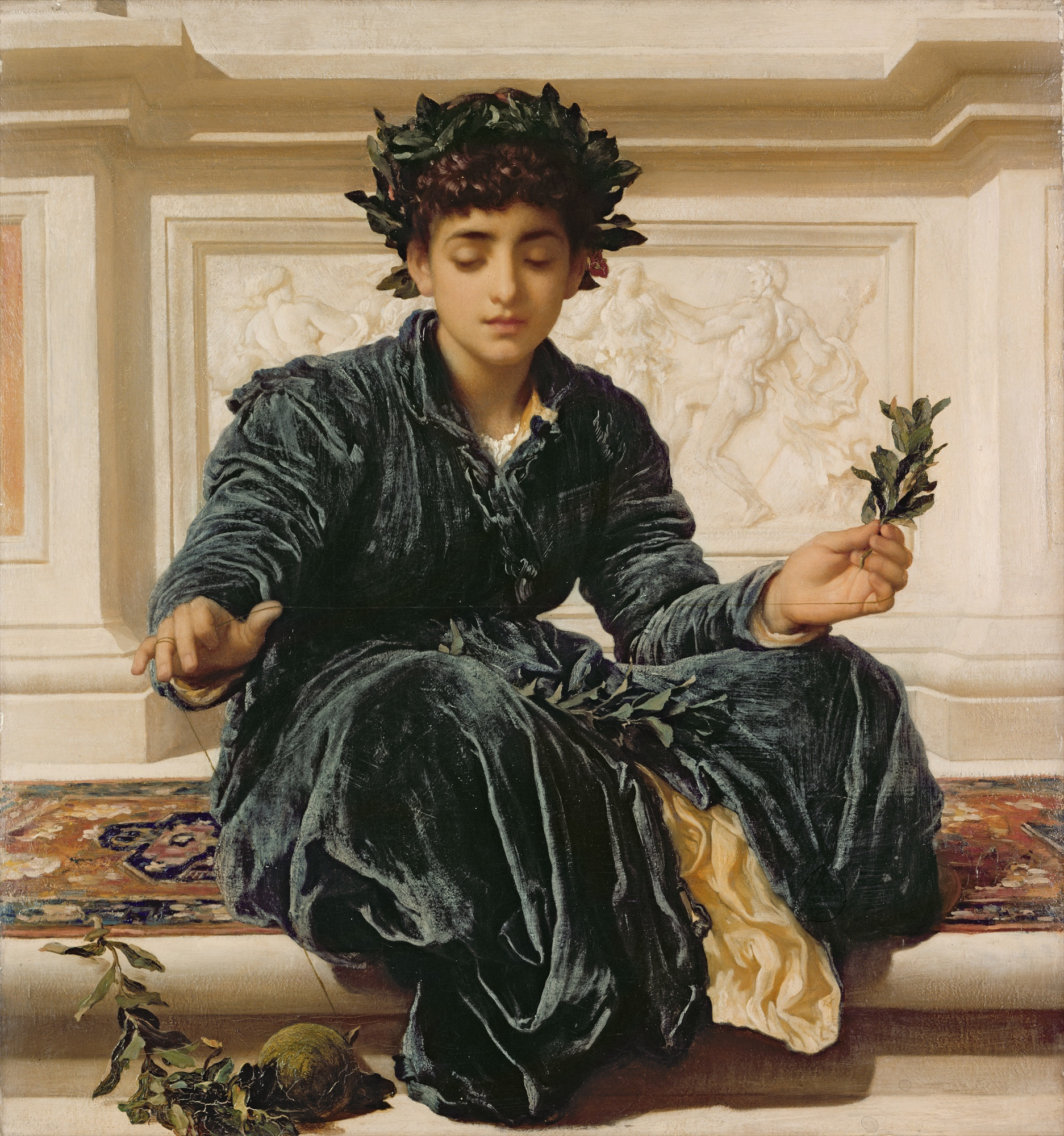
Weaving the Wreath by Frederic Leighton

A Boulogne Flower Girl by William Powell Frith

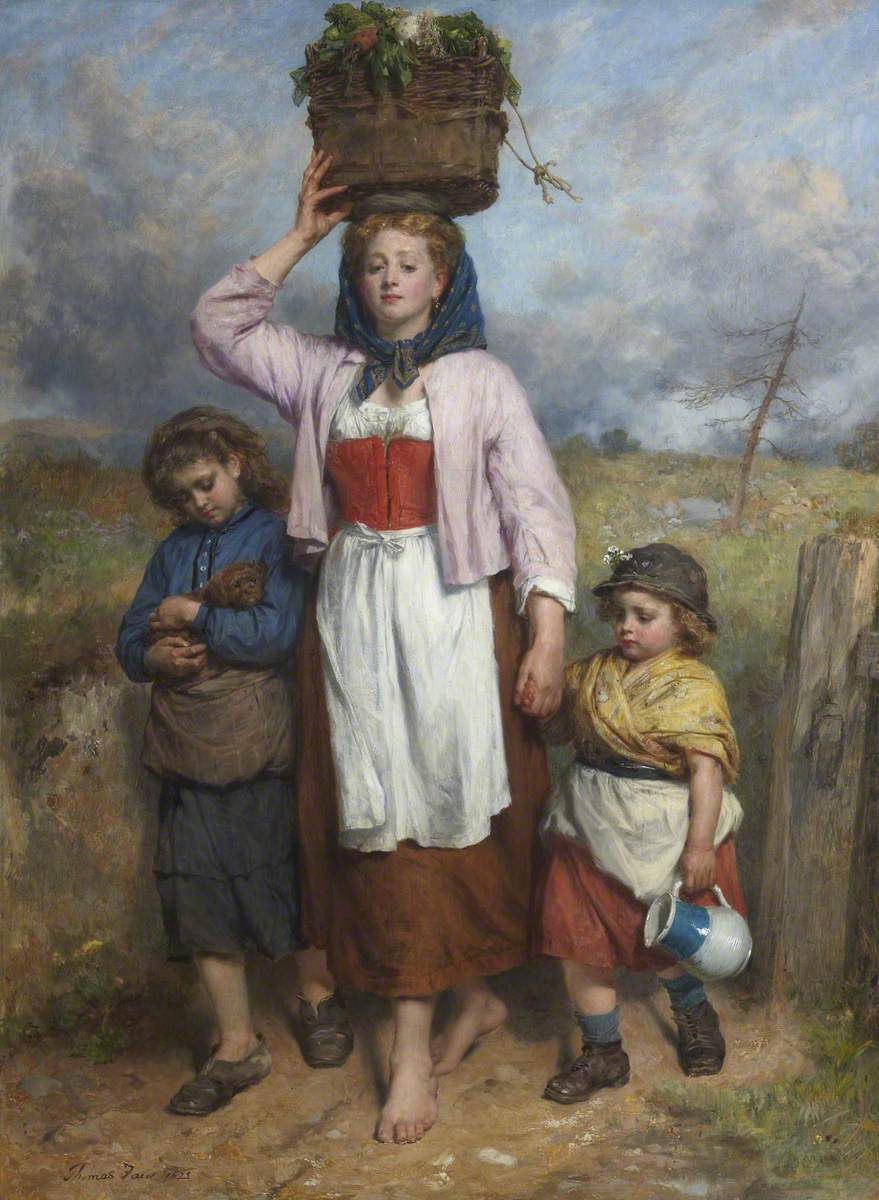
A Lowland Lassie by Thomas Faed

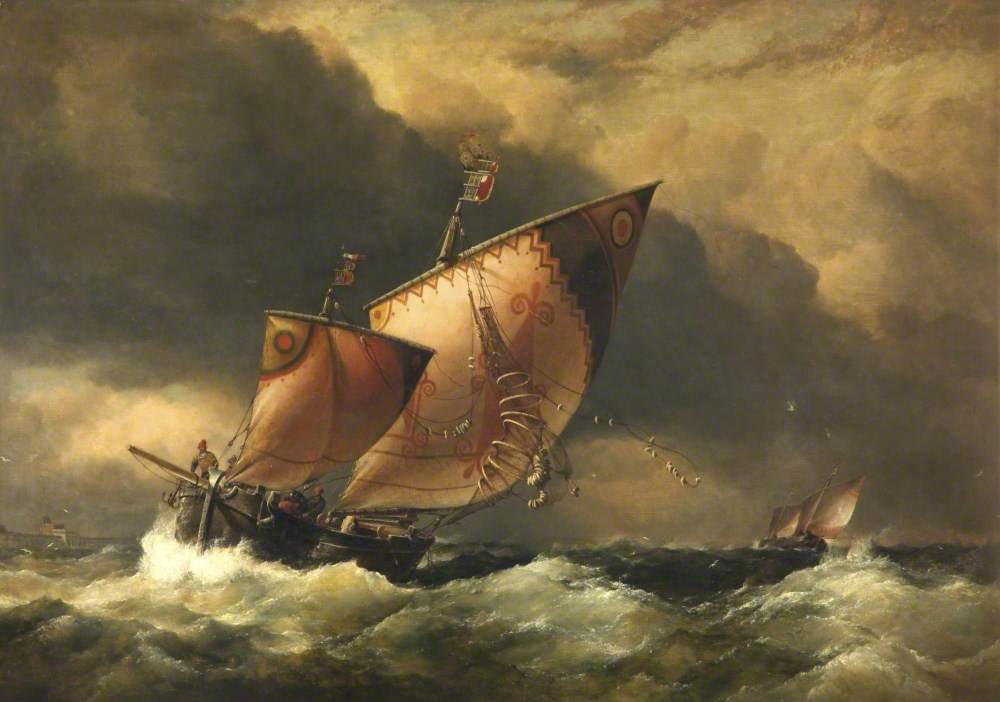
Venetian Fishing Craft Caught in a 'Borasca by Edward William Cooke

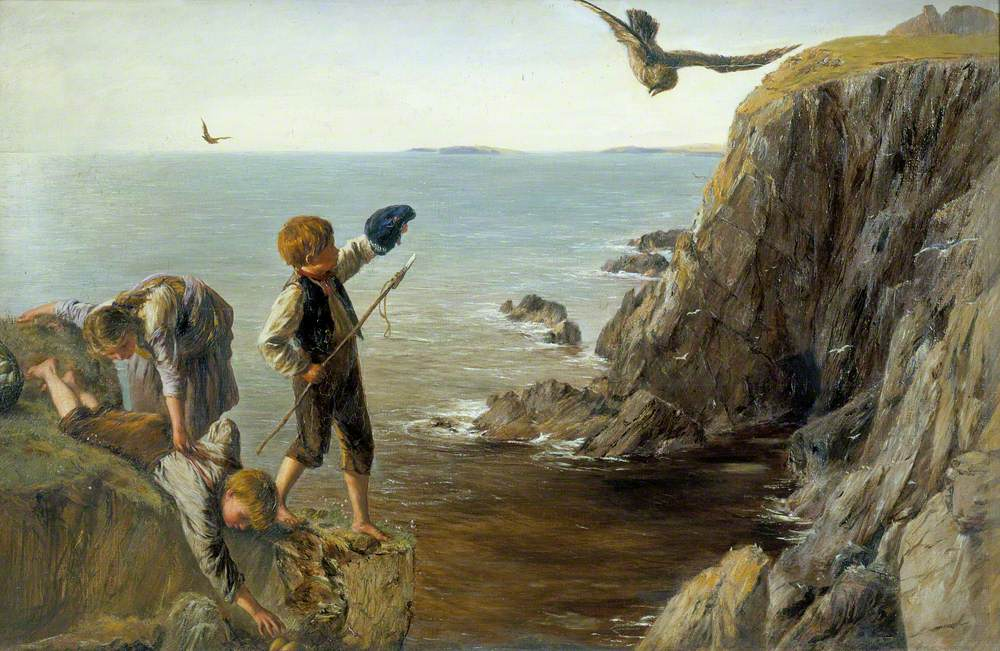
The Bonxie, Shetland by James Clarke Hook

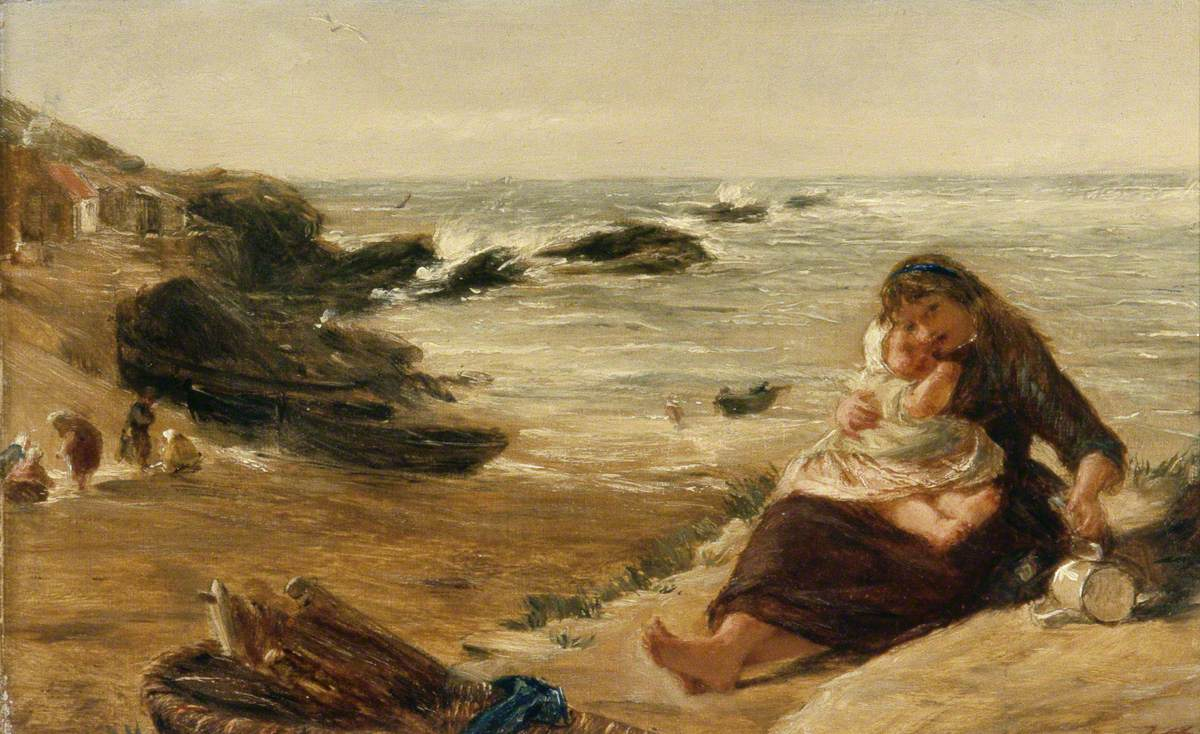
Song and Accompaniment by James Clarke Hook

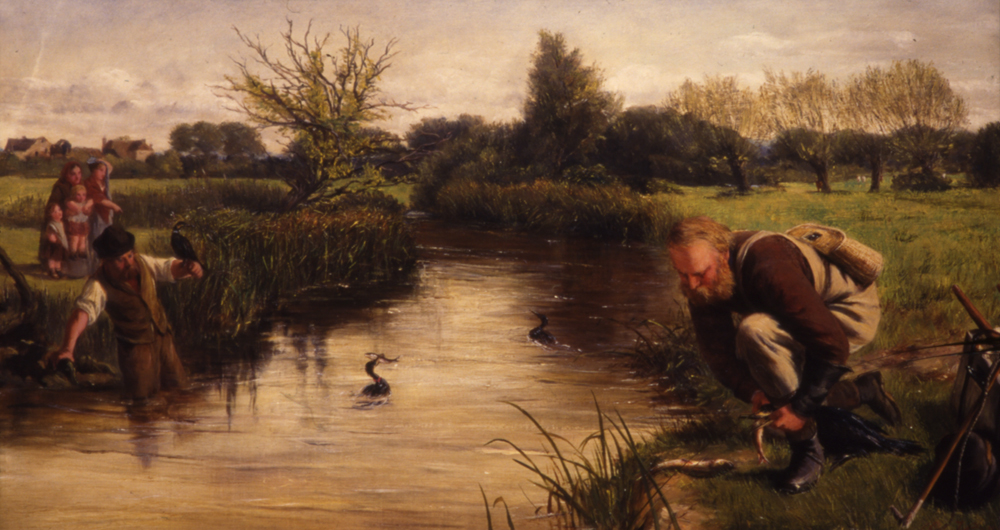
Fishing by Proxy by James Clarke Hook

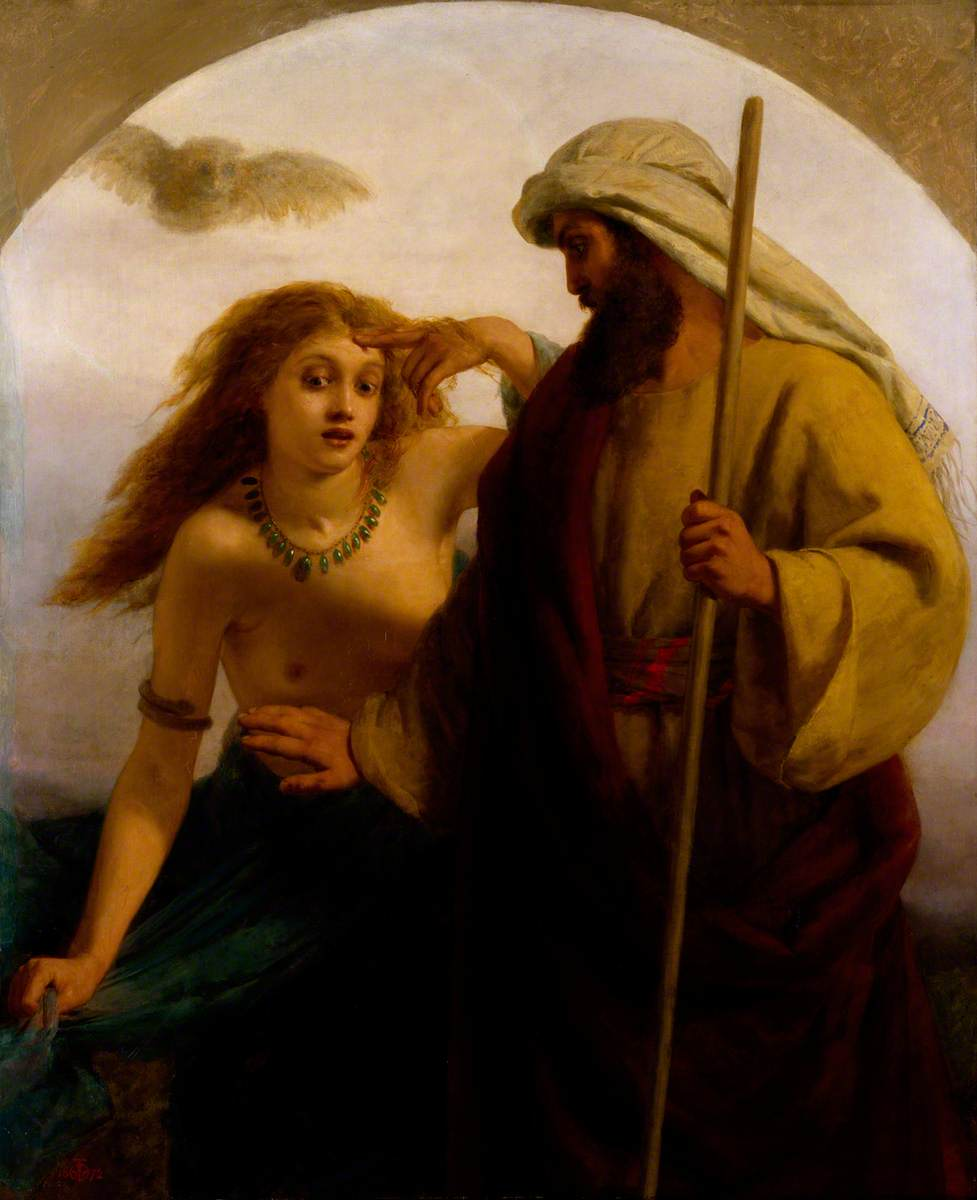
Saint Paul at Philippi by William Charles Thomas Dobson

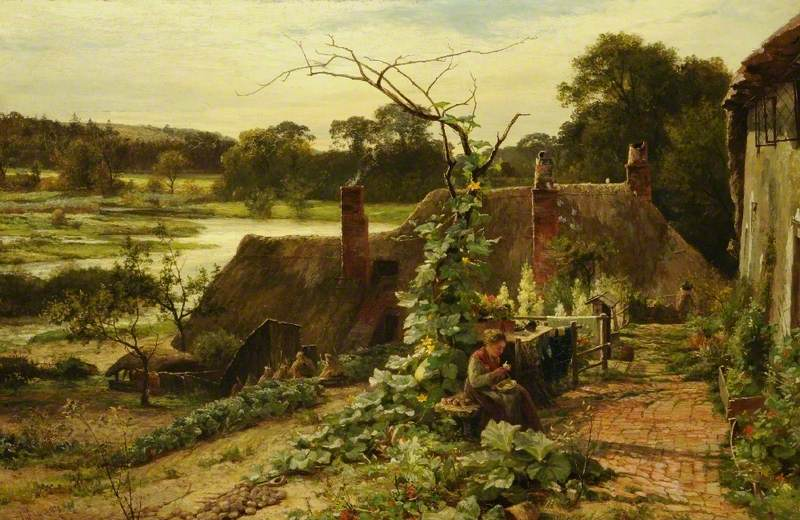
An English Cottage Home by James Aumonier

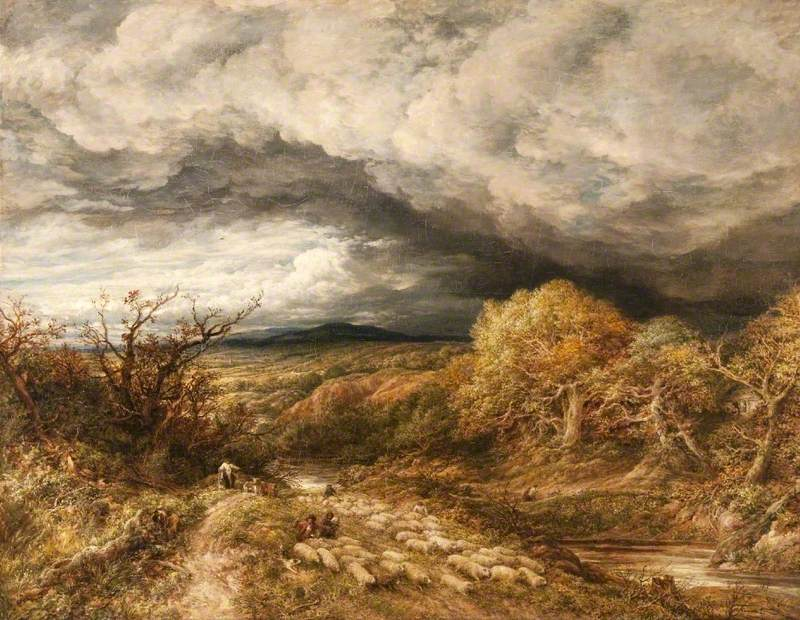
A Coming Storm by John Linnell

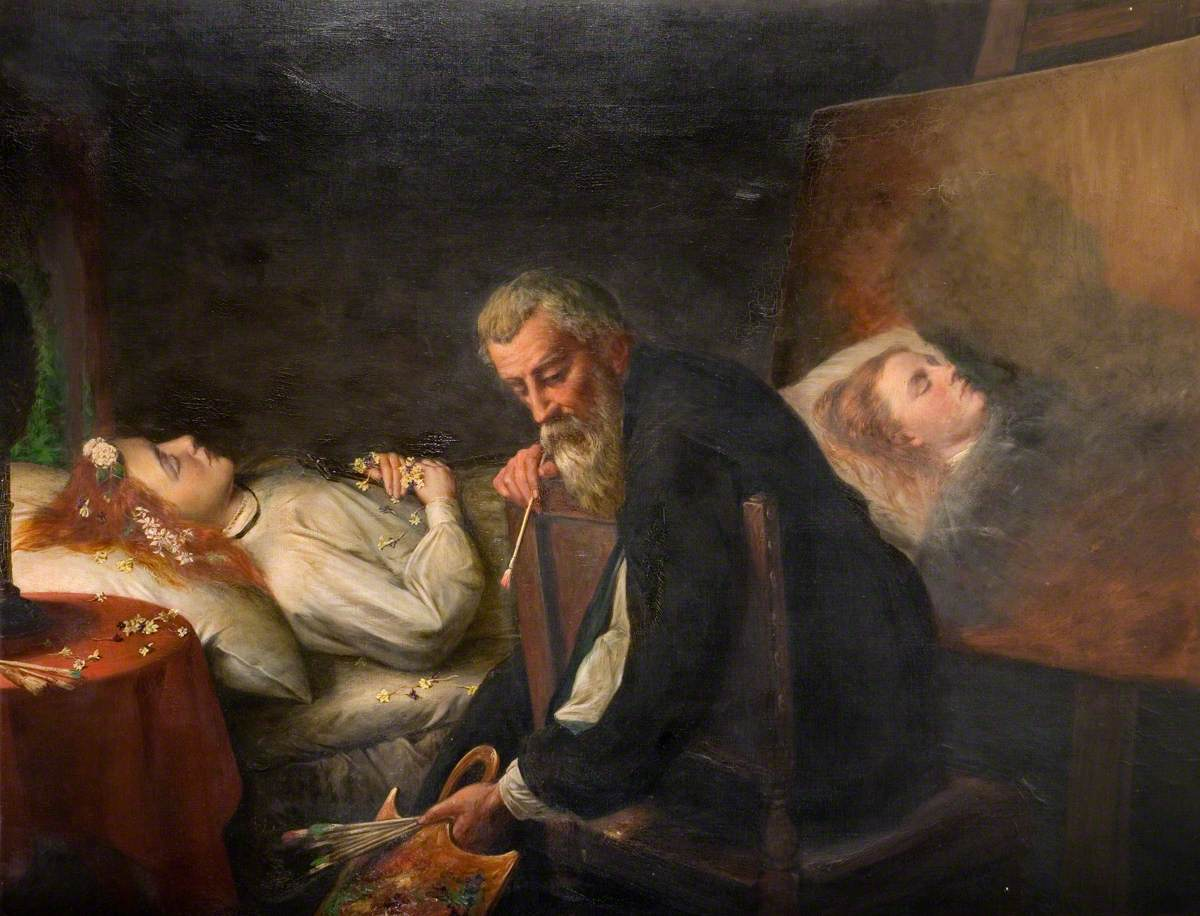
Tintoretto Painting His Dead Daughter by Henry Nelson O'Neil

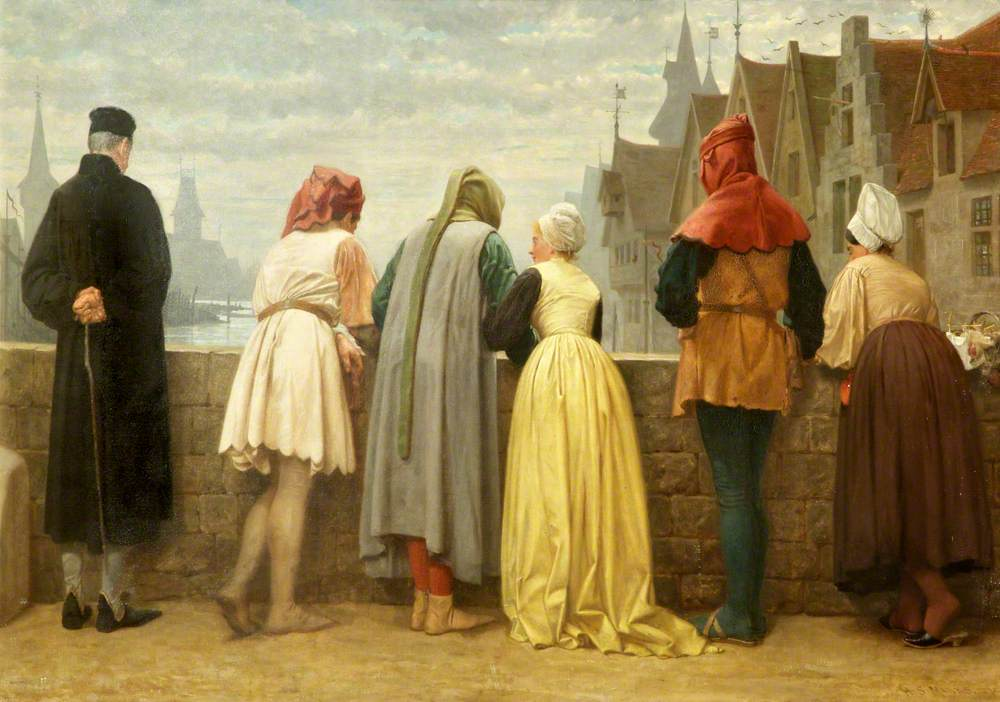
What is it? by Henry Stacy Marks

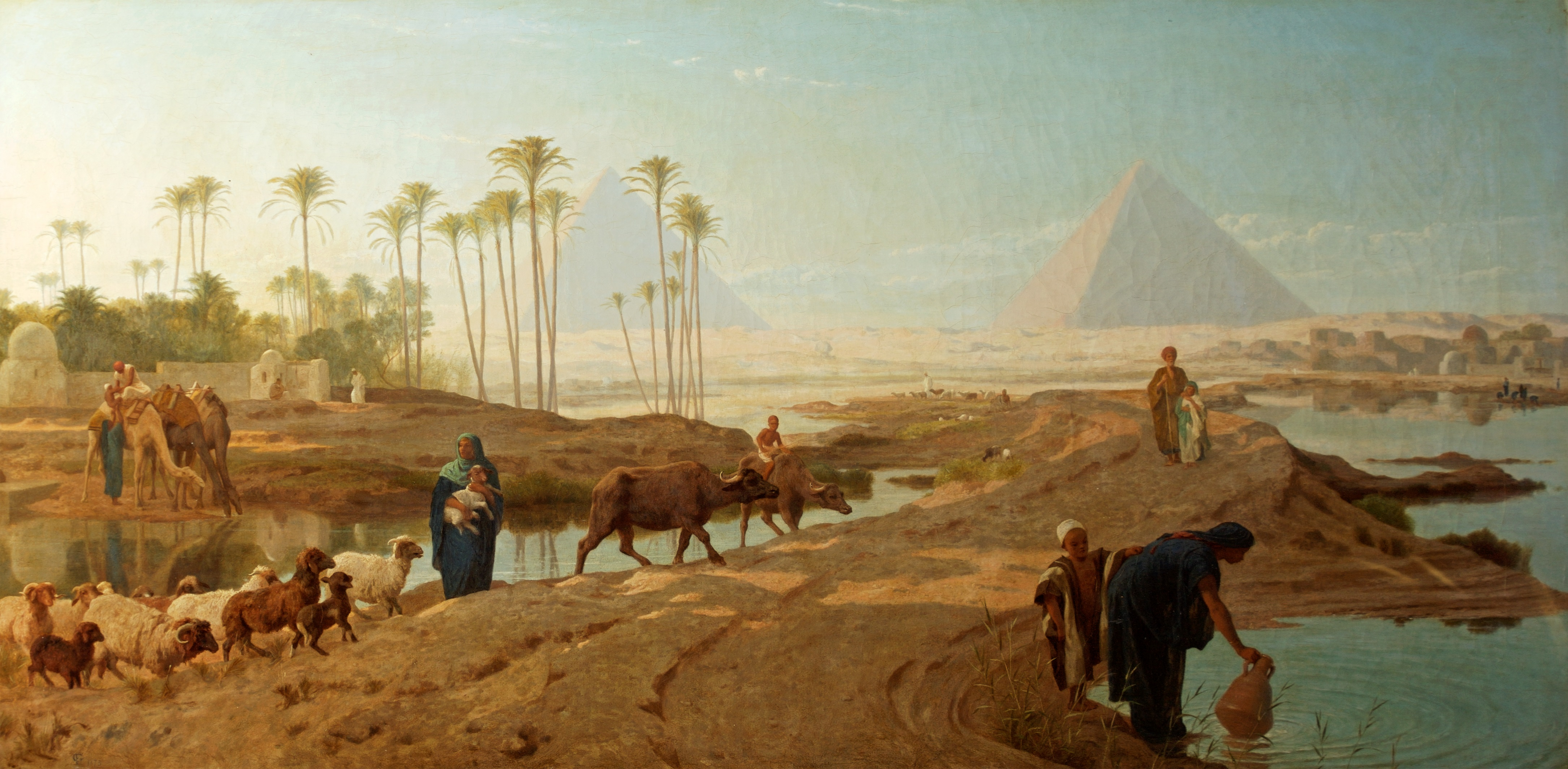
Subsiding of the Nile by Frederick Goodall

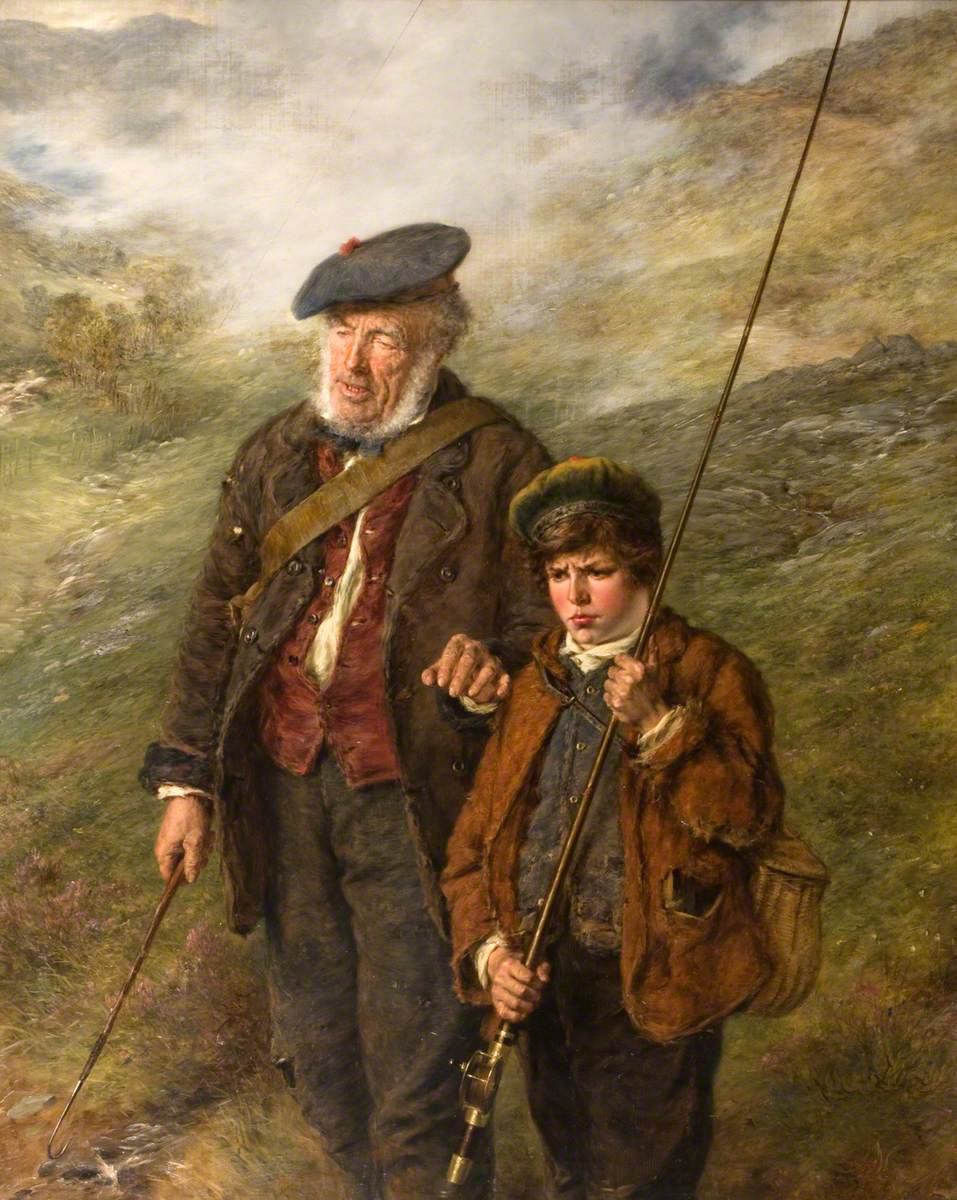
Steady, Johnnie – Stead by Erskine Nicol

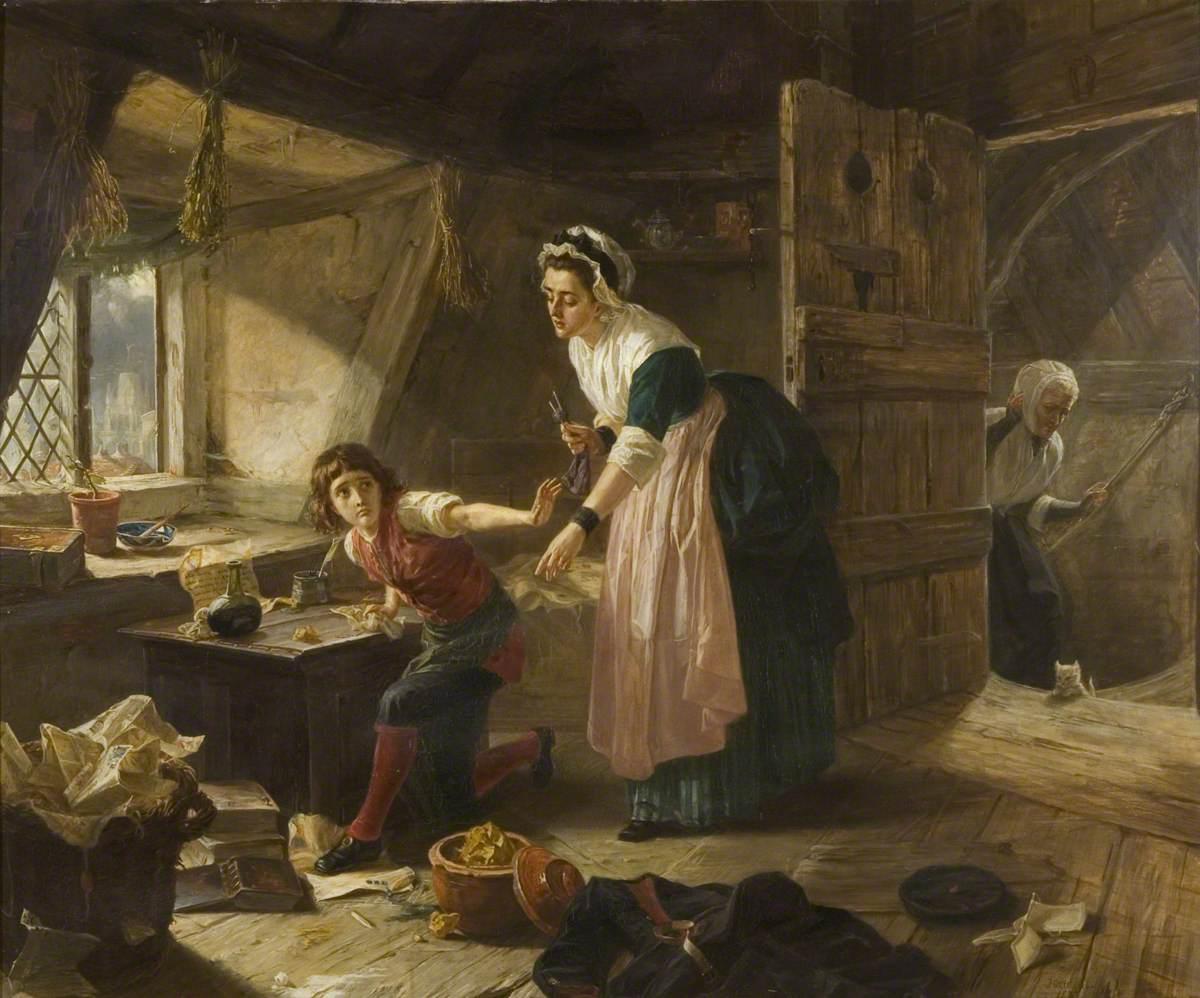
Chatterton, 1765 by Henrietta Ward

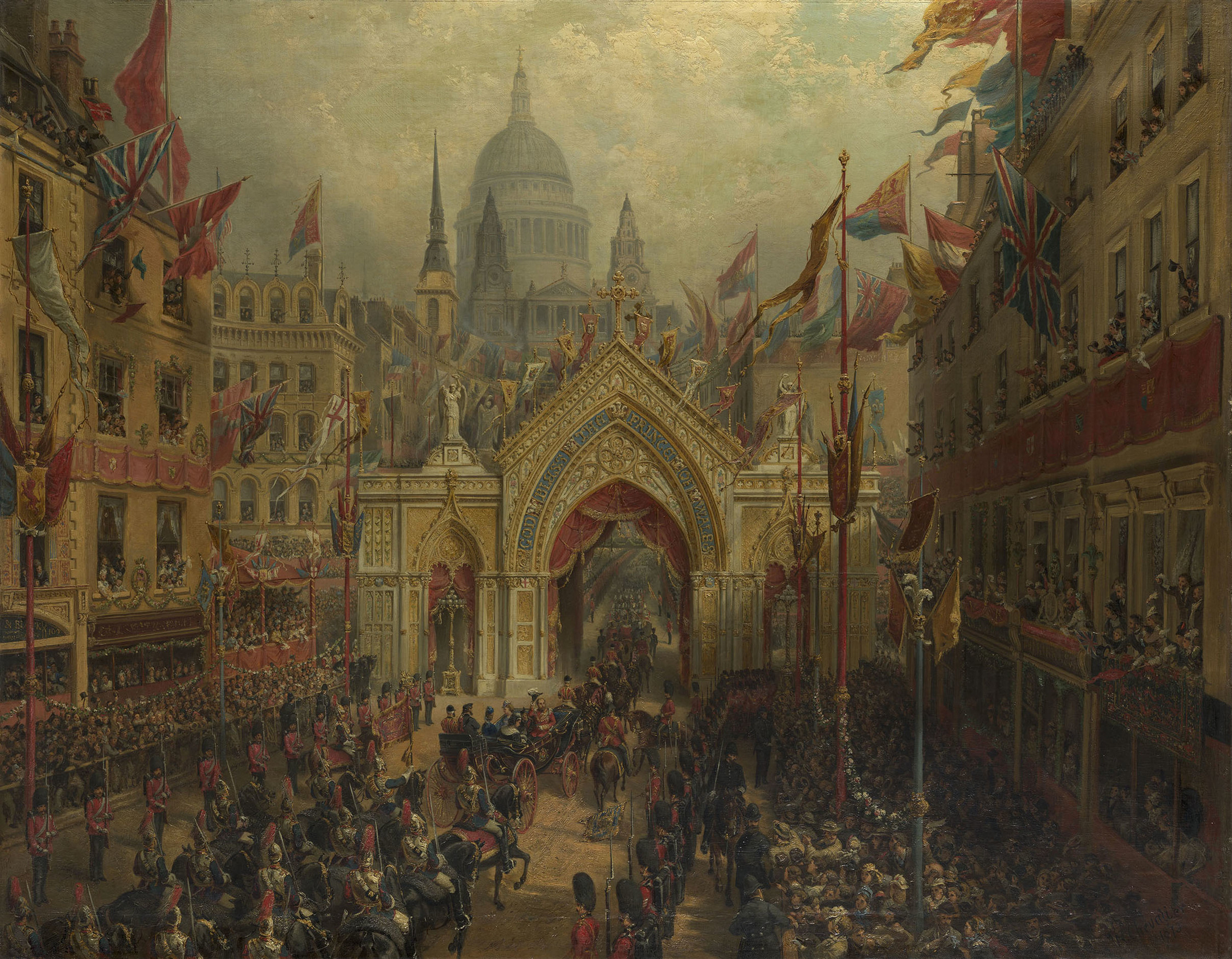
Thanksgiving Day, The Procession to St Paul's Cathedral, 27 February 1872 by Nicholas Chevalier

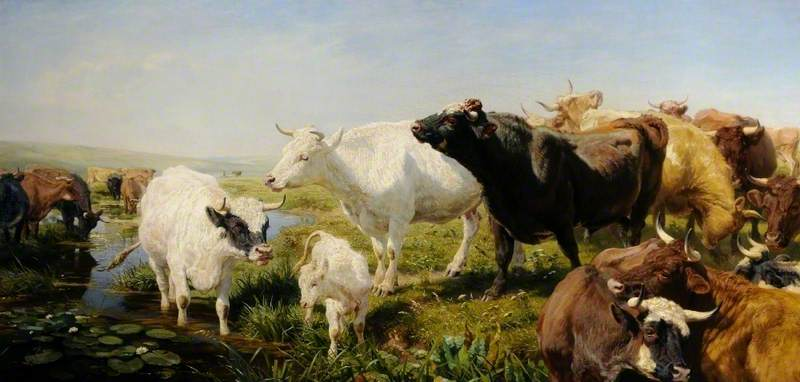
A Summer Afternoon by Henry William Banks Davis

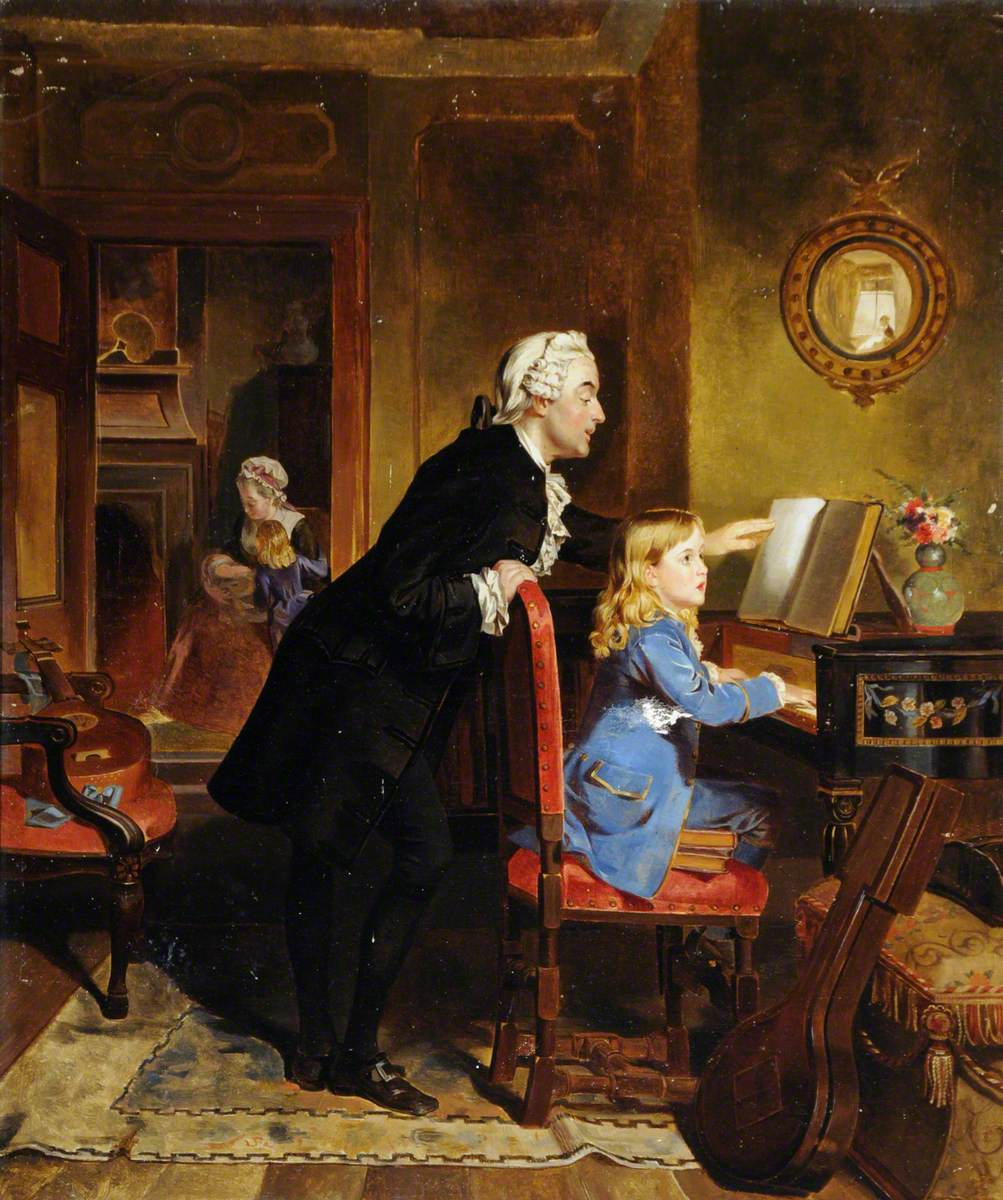
Childhood of Mozart by Ebenezer Crawford

Love in a Maze by George Adolphus Storey

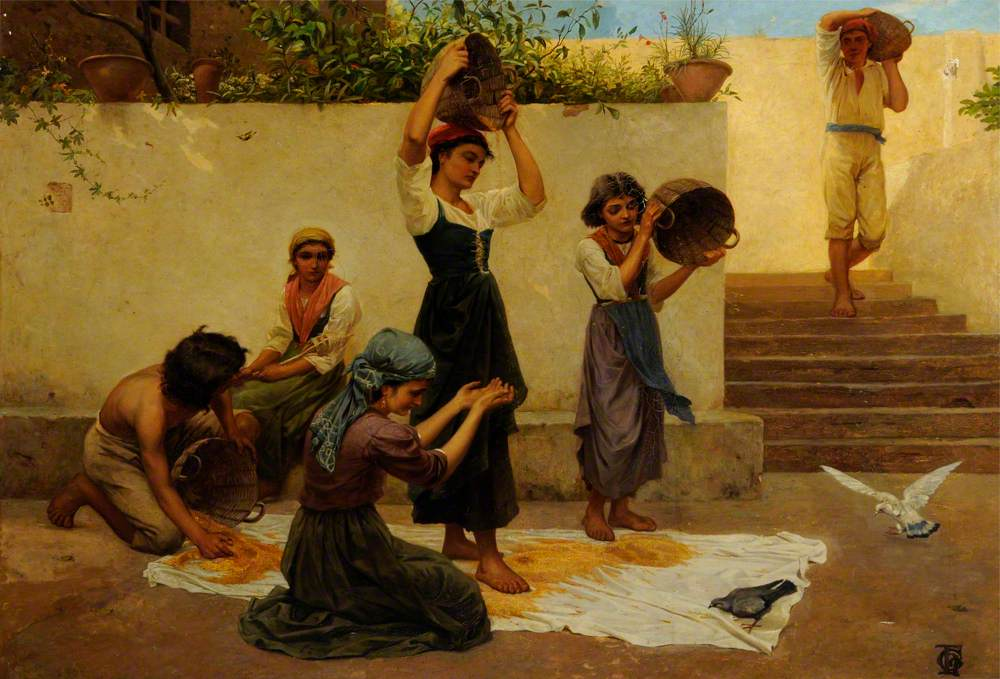
Capri Girls Winnowing Corn by Howard Goodall

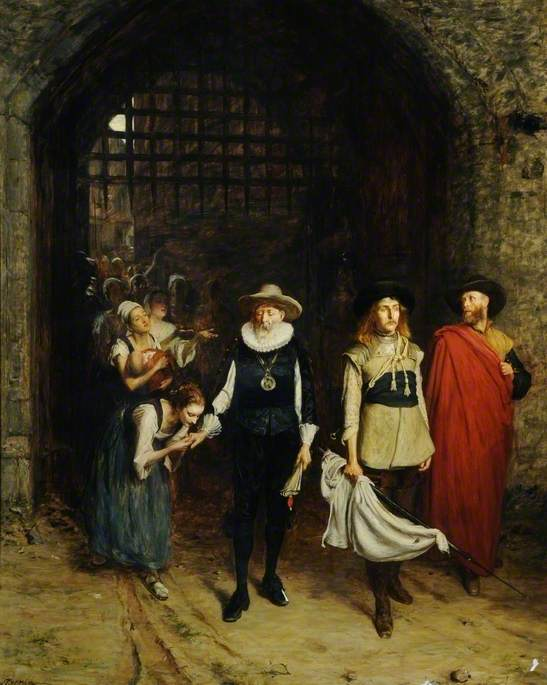
The Flag of Truce by John Pettie

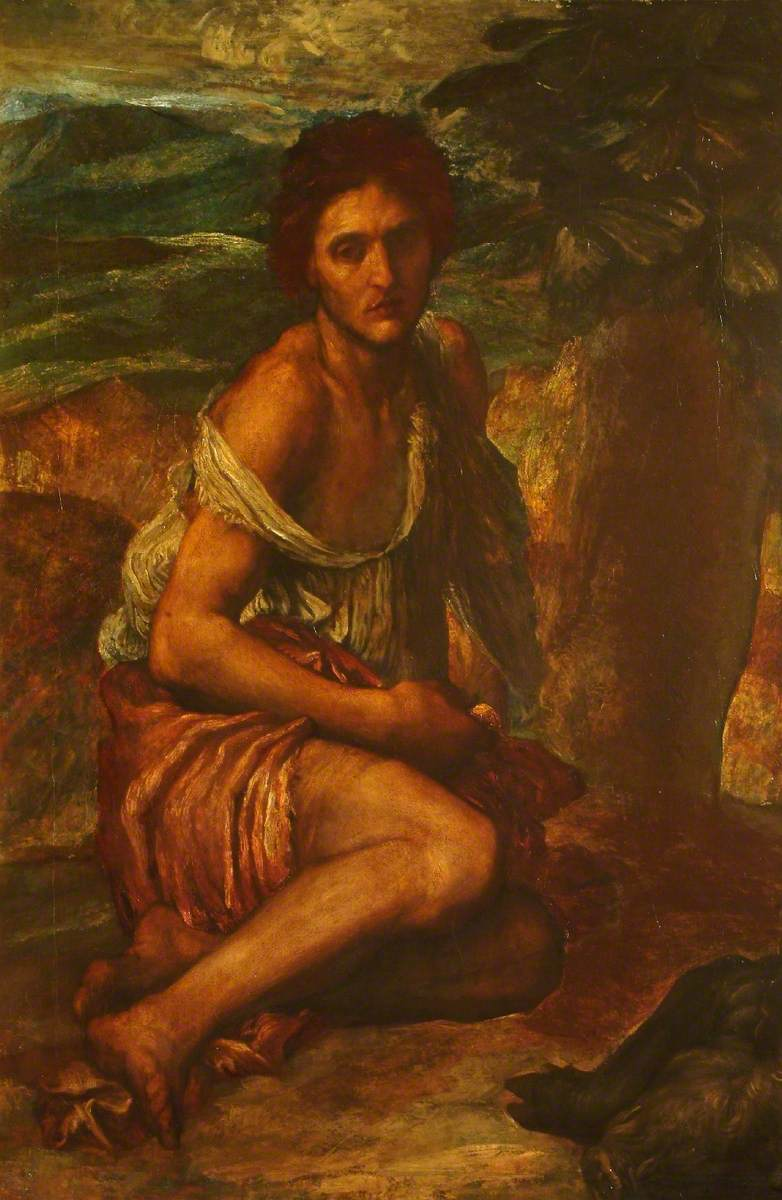
The Prodigal Son by George Frederic Watts

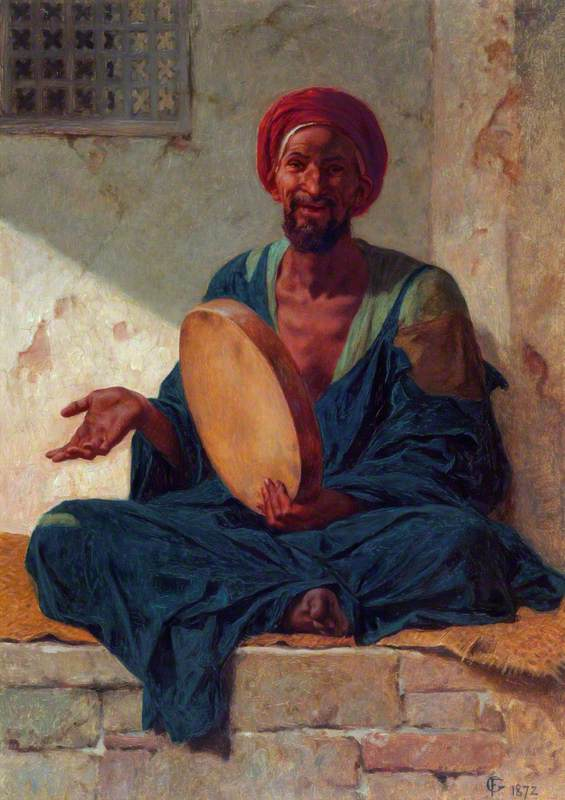
An Arab Improvisatore by Frederick Goodall

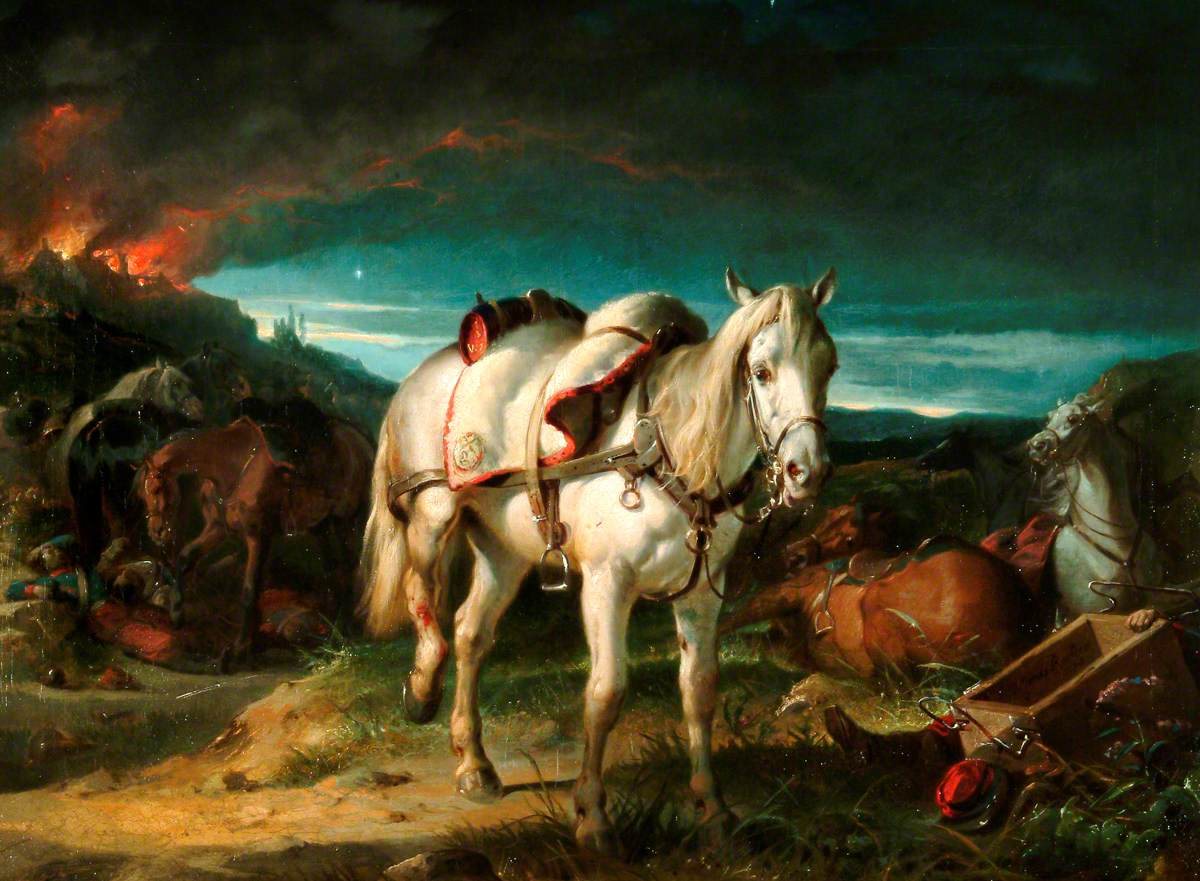
Riderless Horse After the Battle of Sedan by Thomas Jones Barker

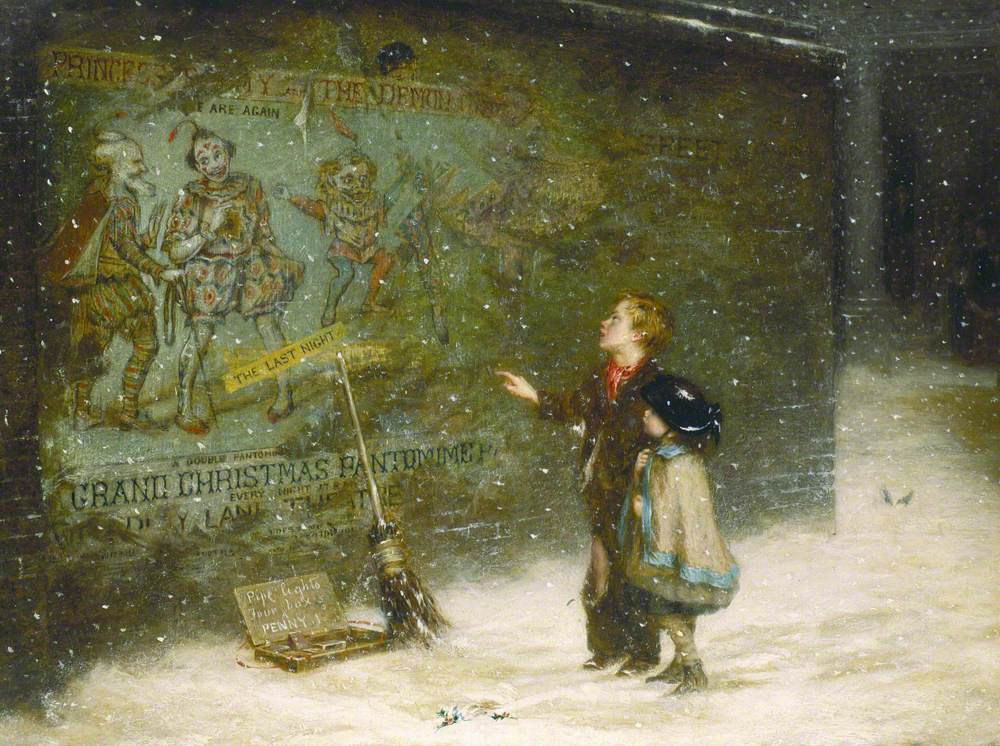
Remembering Joys That Have Passed Away by Augustus Edwin Mulready

The Introduction of Lady Mary Wortley Montague to the Kit Kat Club by Andrew Carrick Gow

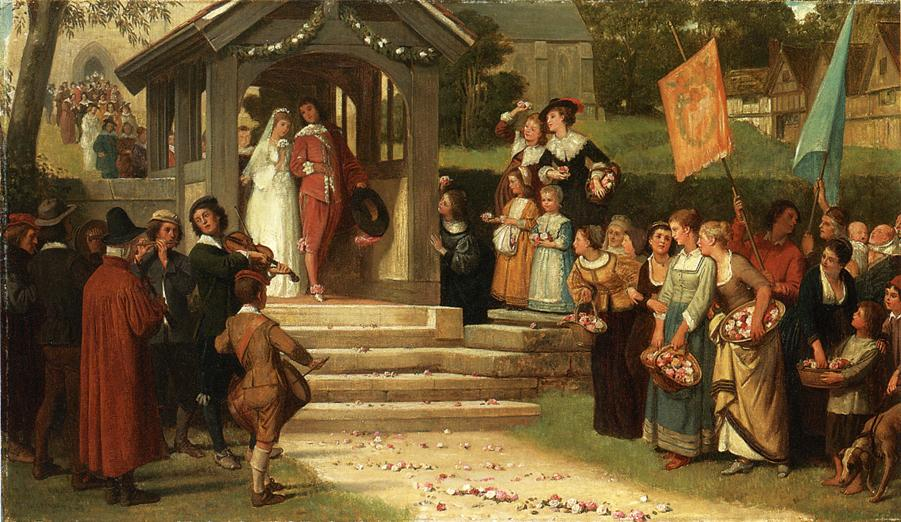
The Path of Roses by William Frederick Yeames

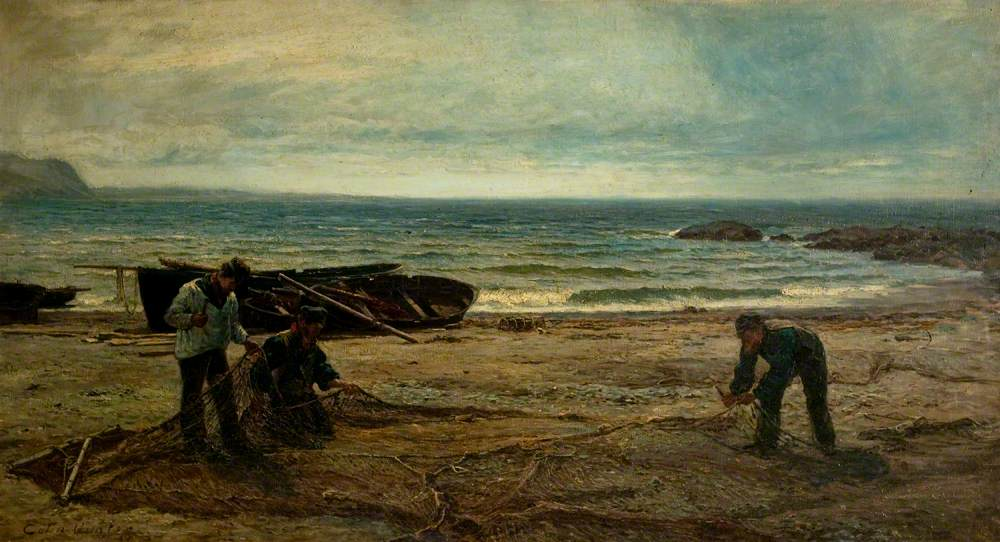
Three Fishers by Colin Hunter

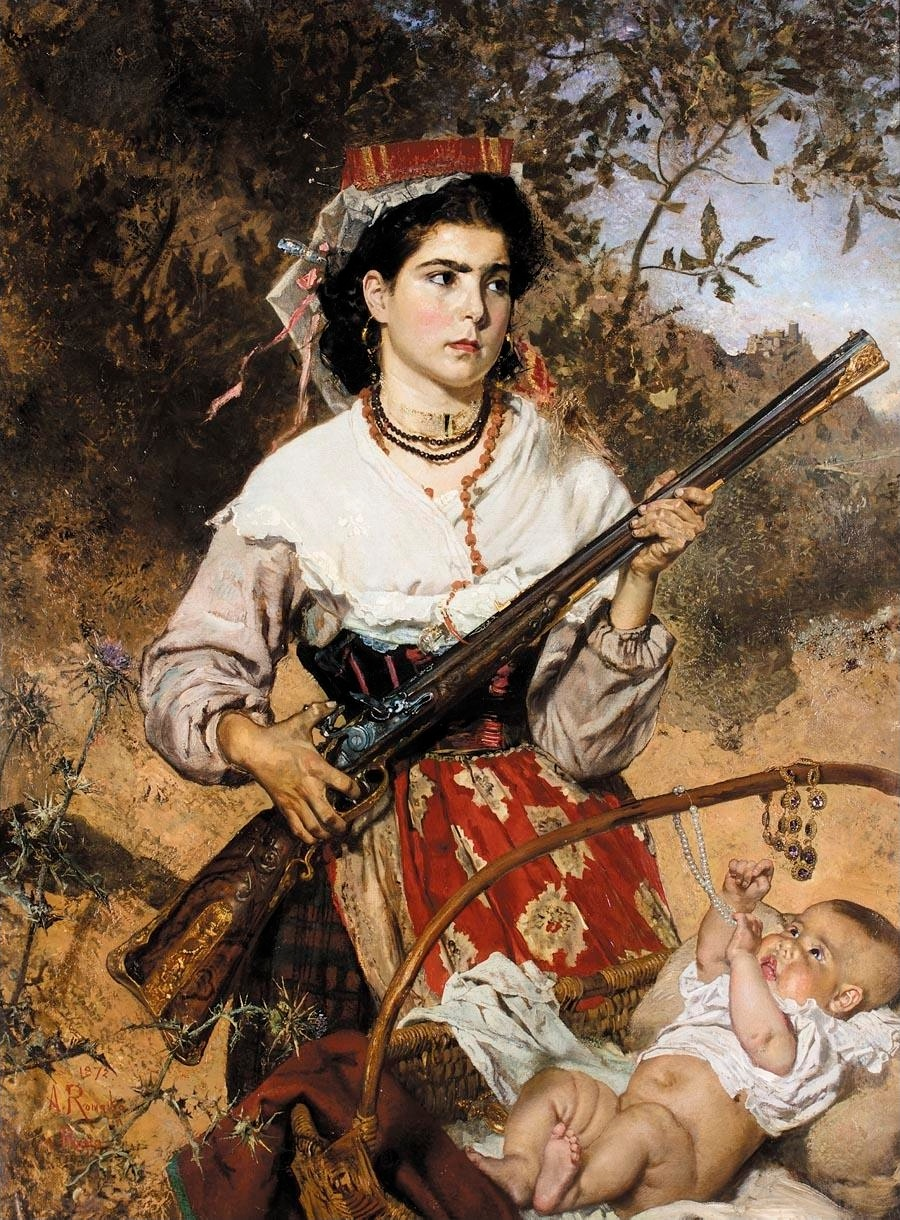
The Brigand's Wife by Anton Romako

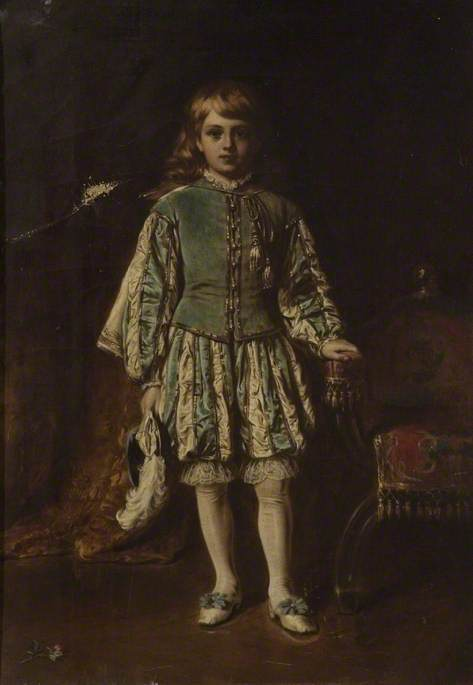
My Lady's Page by John Robert Dicksee

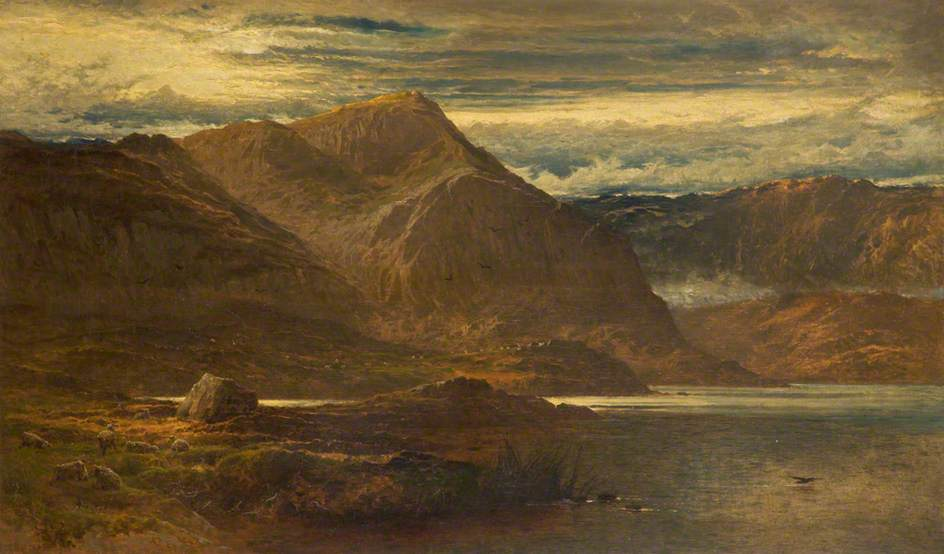
Mountain Solitude by Benjamin Williams Leader

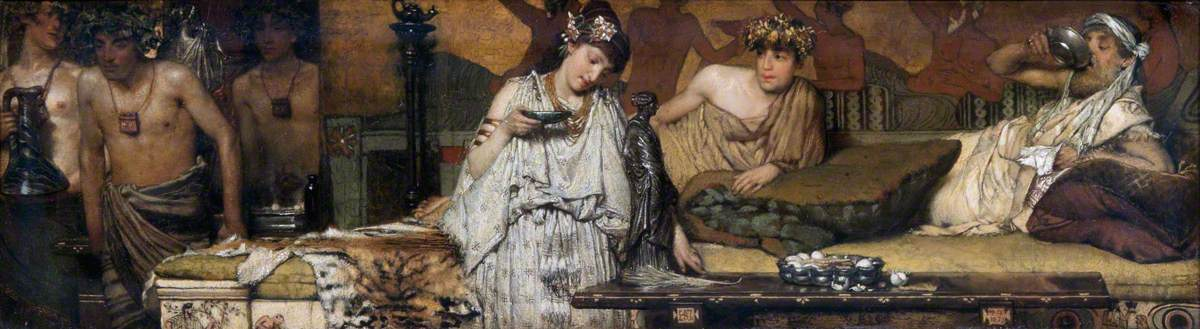
The Dinner by Lawrence Alma-Tadema

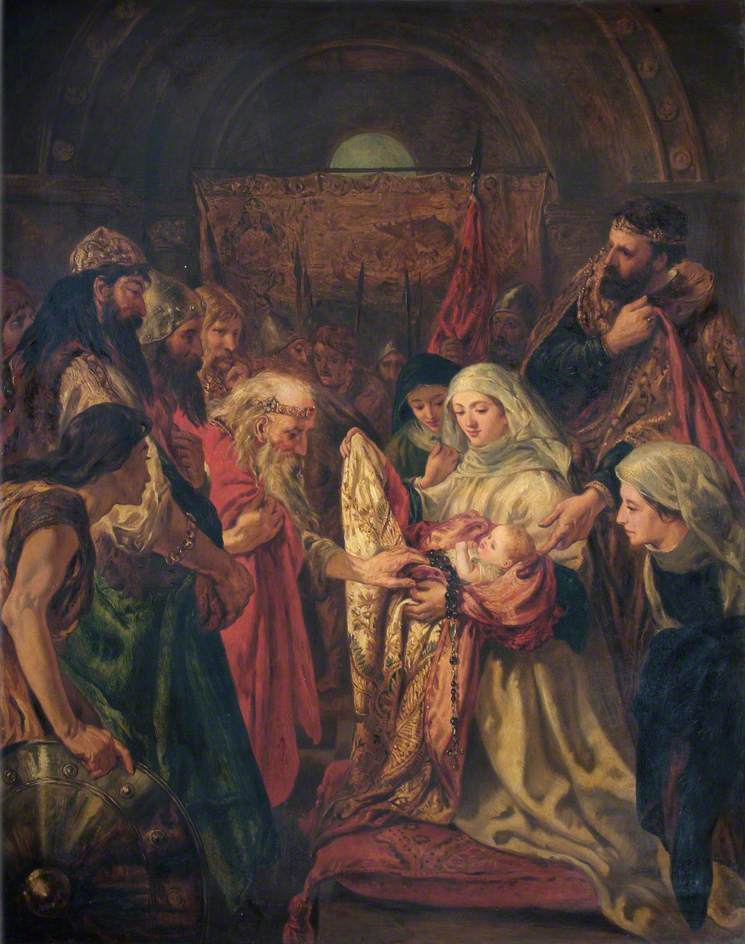
Edward I Presents the First Prince of Wales to the Welsh Chieftains at Carnarvon by John Gilbert

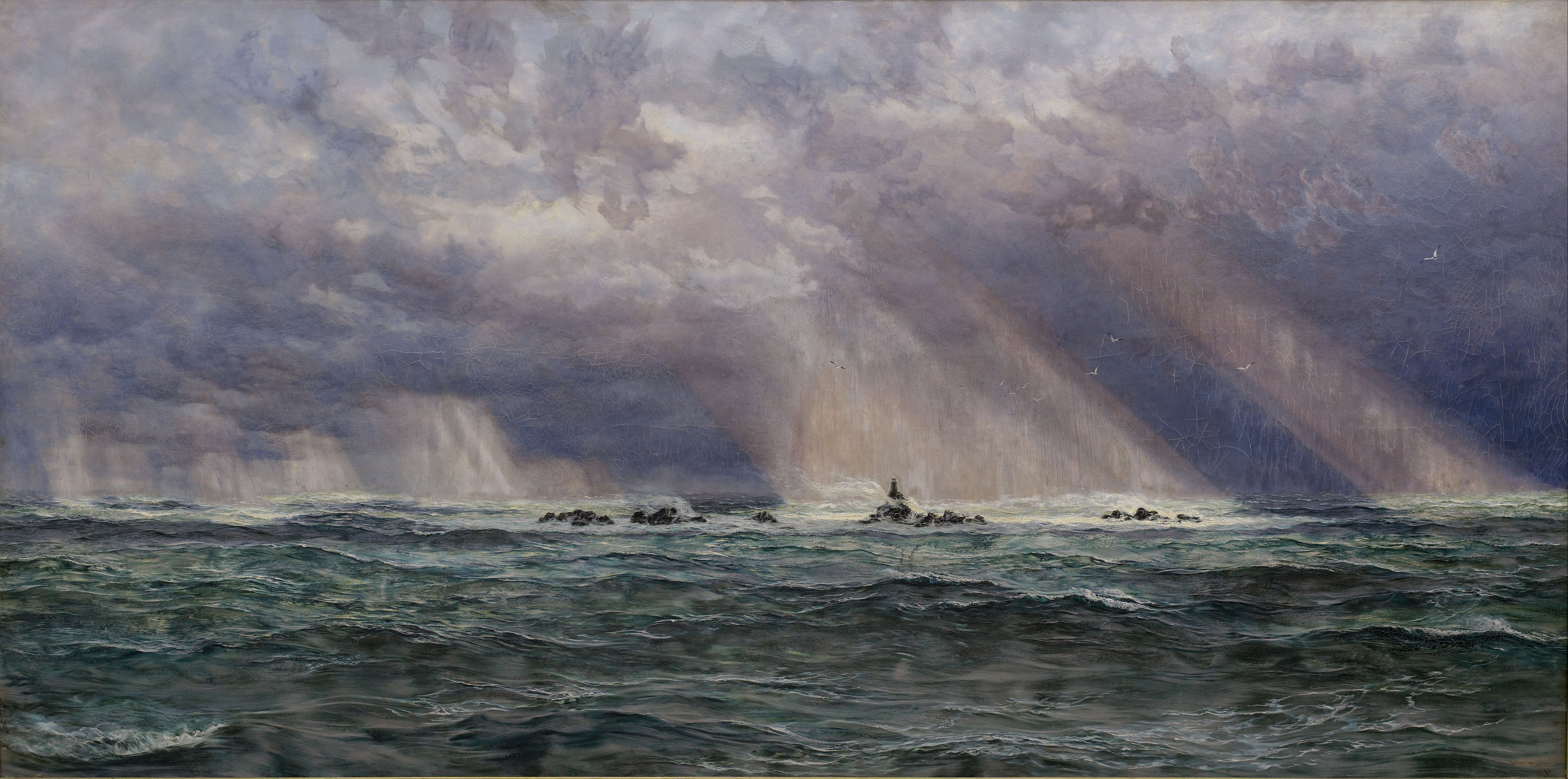
A North-West Gale off the Longships Lighthouse by John Brett

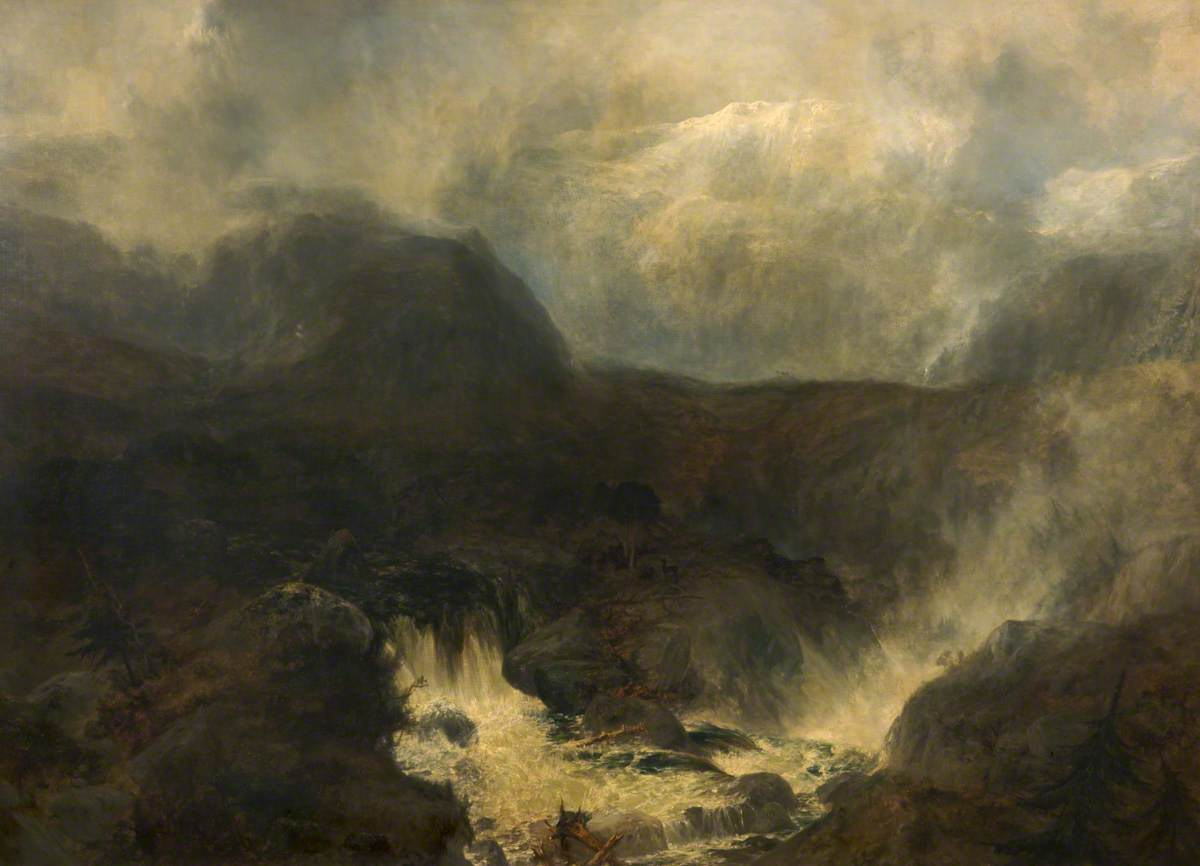
Mountain Stream, Glen Derry, Aberdeenshire by John Wright Oakes

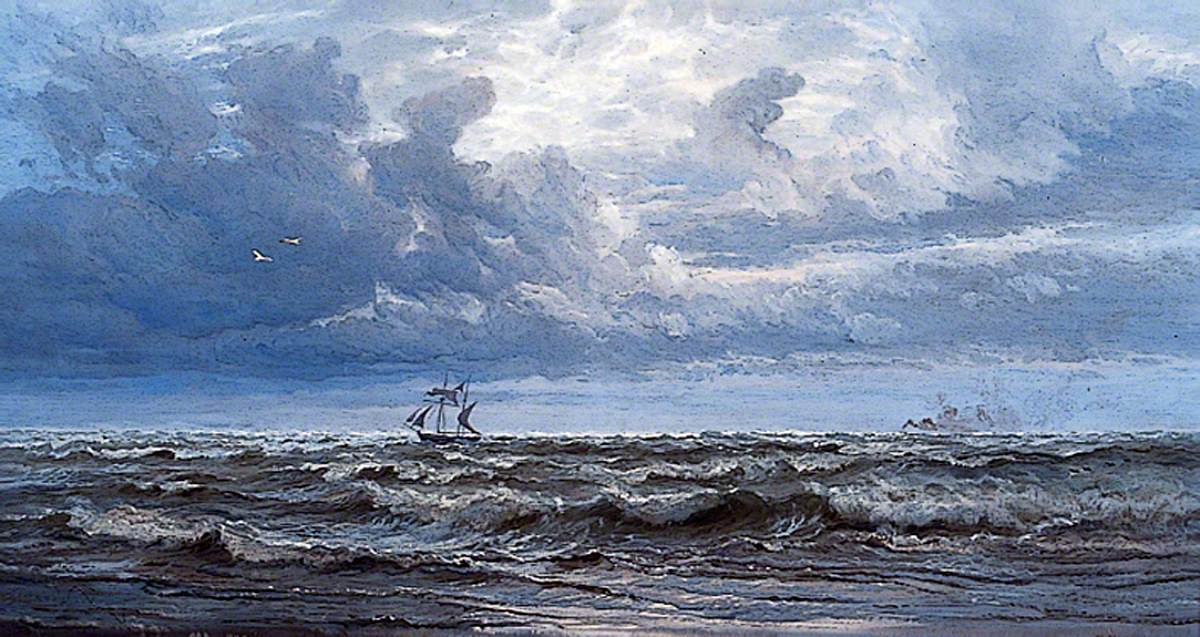
Crossing the Bar by Henry Moore

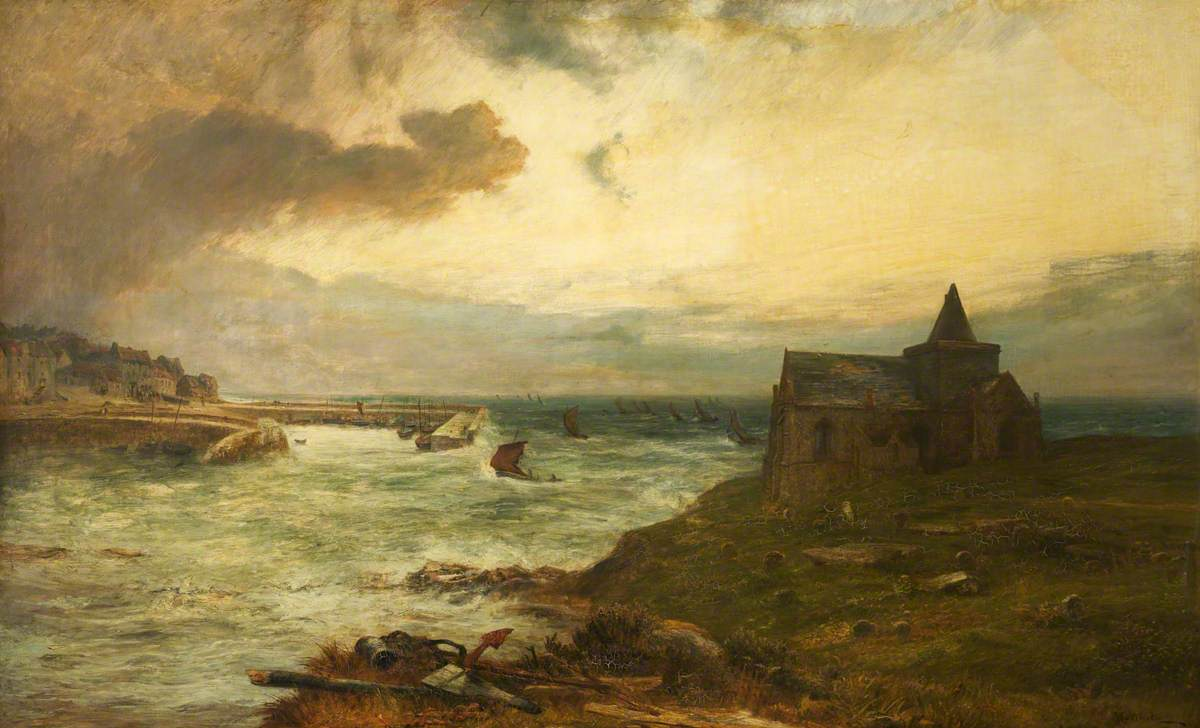
The Fisherman's Haven by John MacWhirter

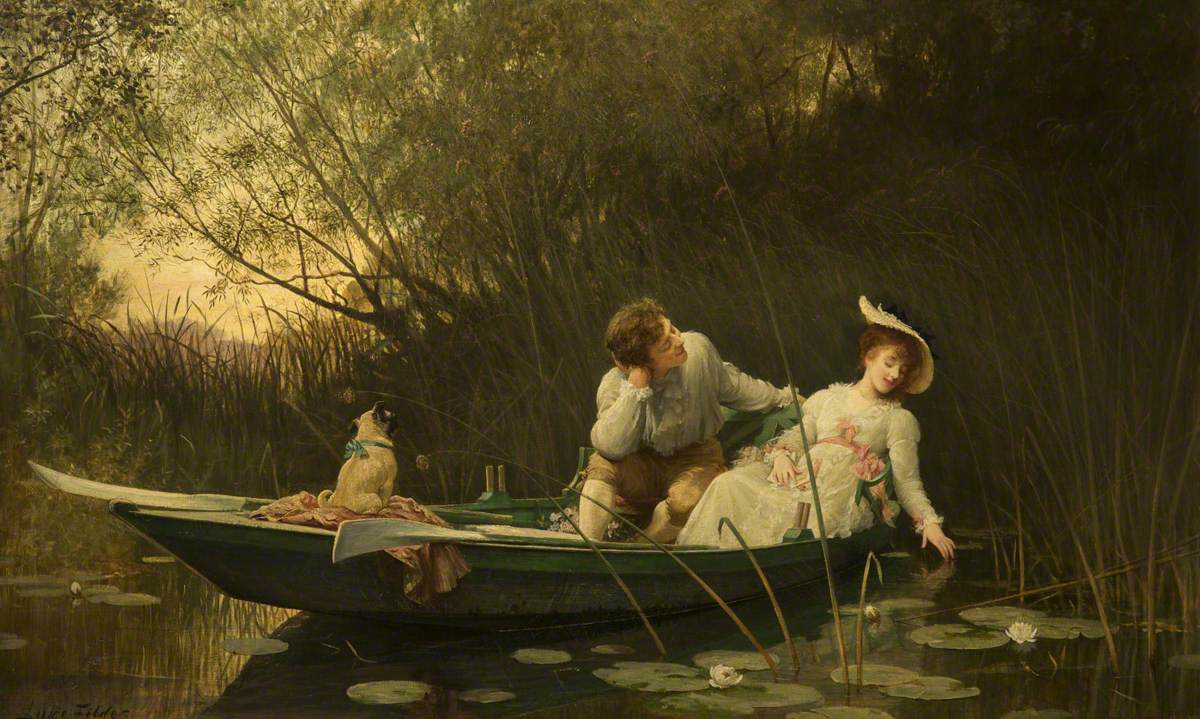
Simpletons by Luke Fildes

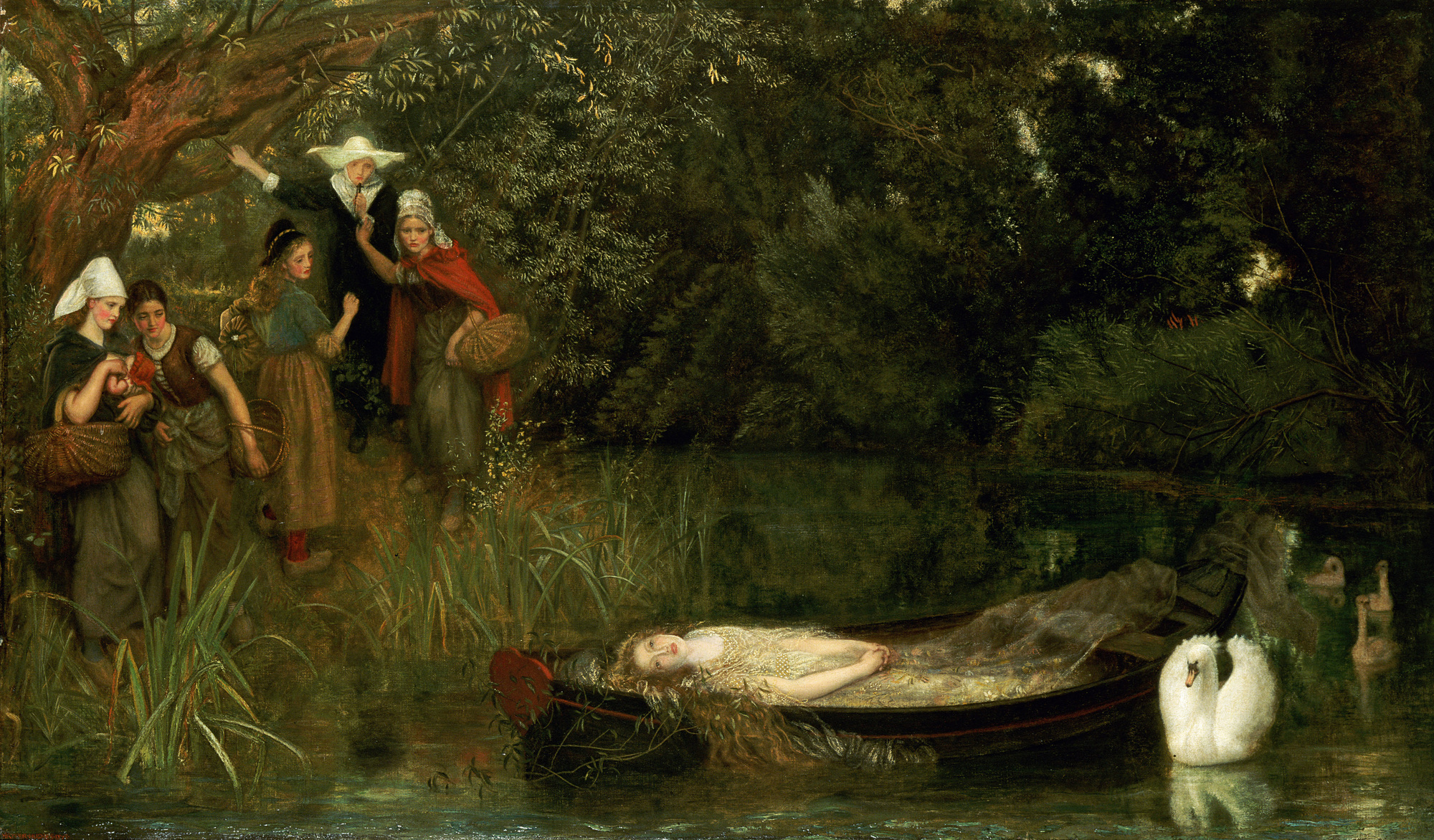
The Lady of Shalott by Arthur Hughes

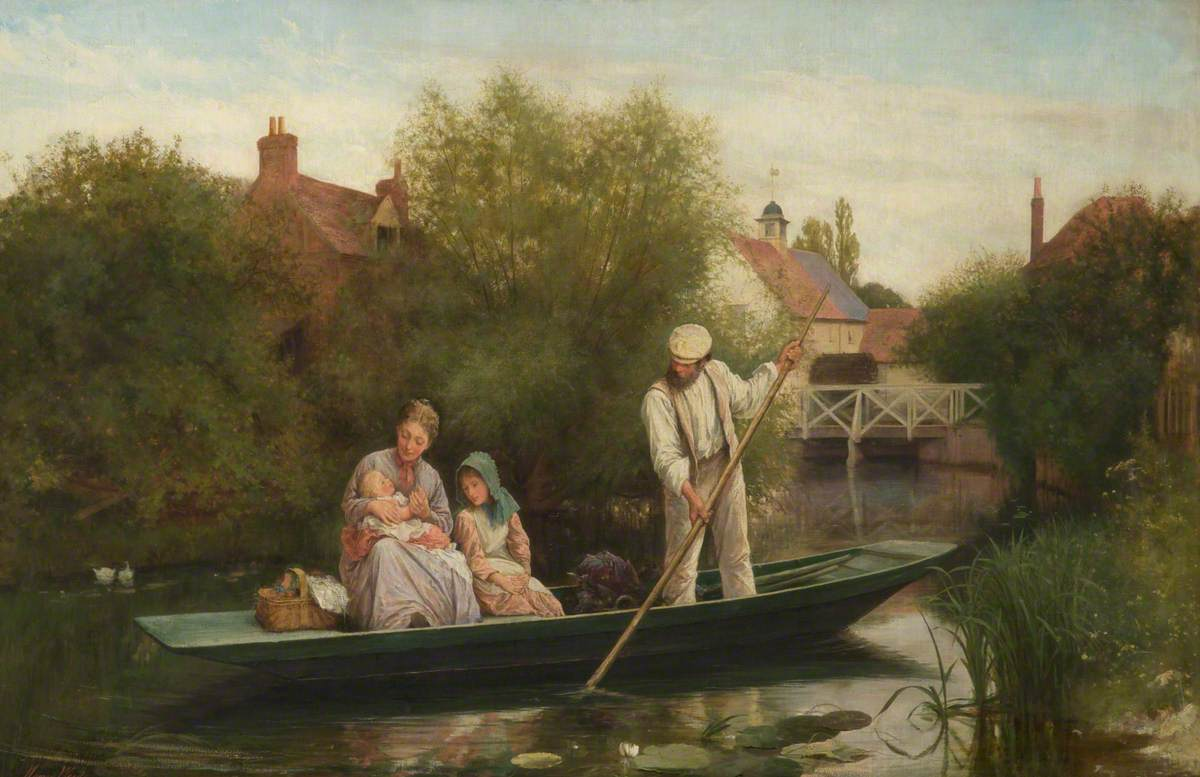
Going Home by Henry Woods

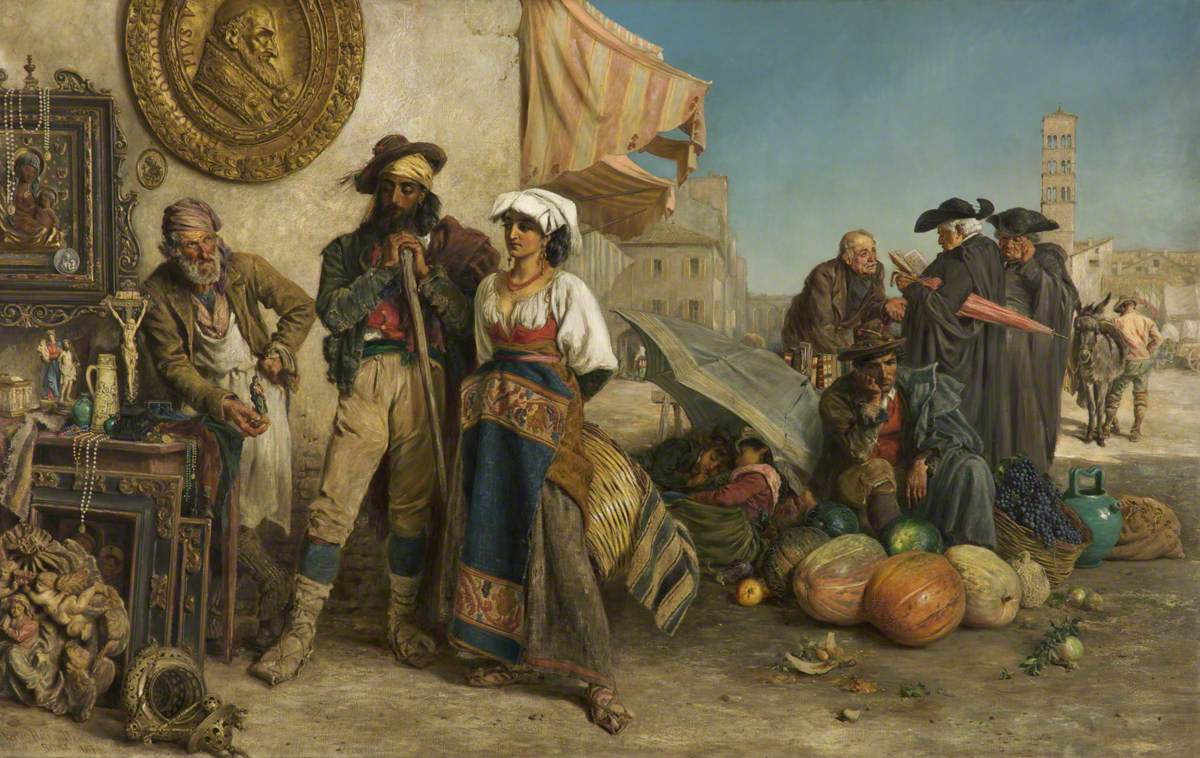
Il Madonnajo by Keeley Halswelle

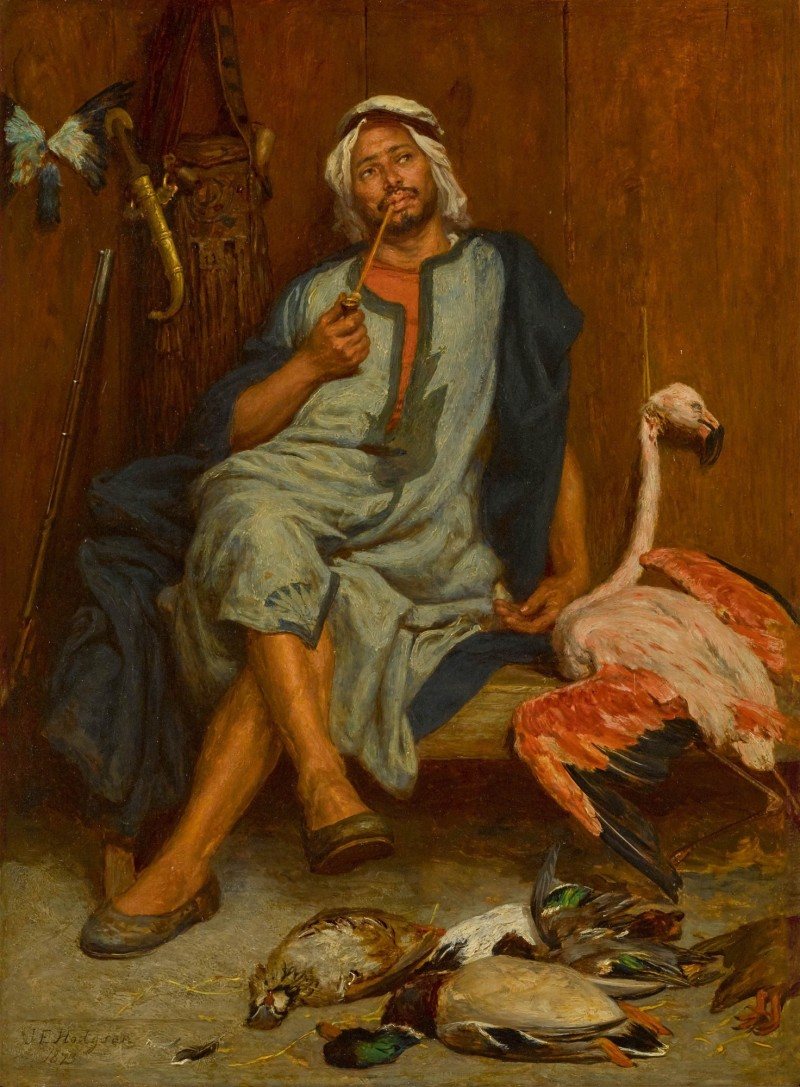
A Tunisian Bird Seller by John Evan Hodgson

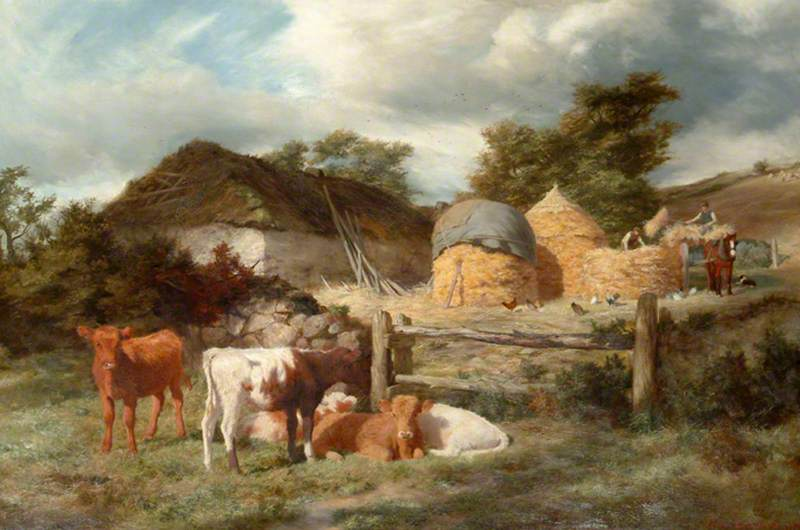
A Highland Croft by Peter Graham

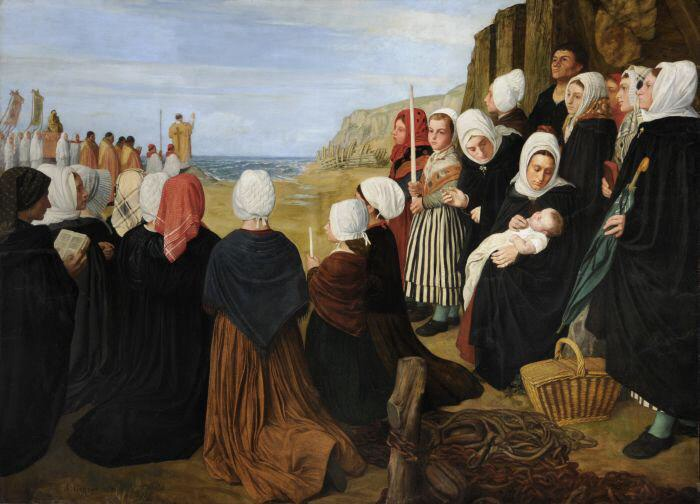
Blessing of the Sea by Alphonse Legros

A Despatch from Trezibond by Henry Wallis

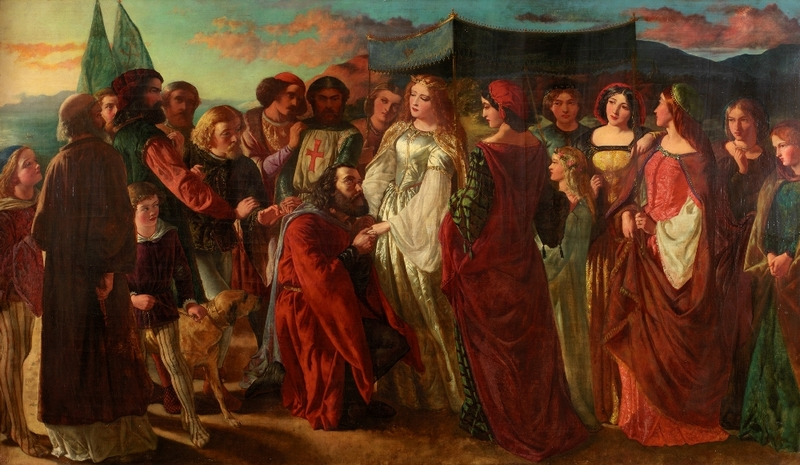
The Lady's Knight by David Wilkie Wynfield

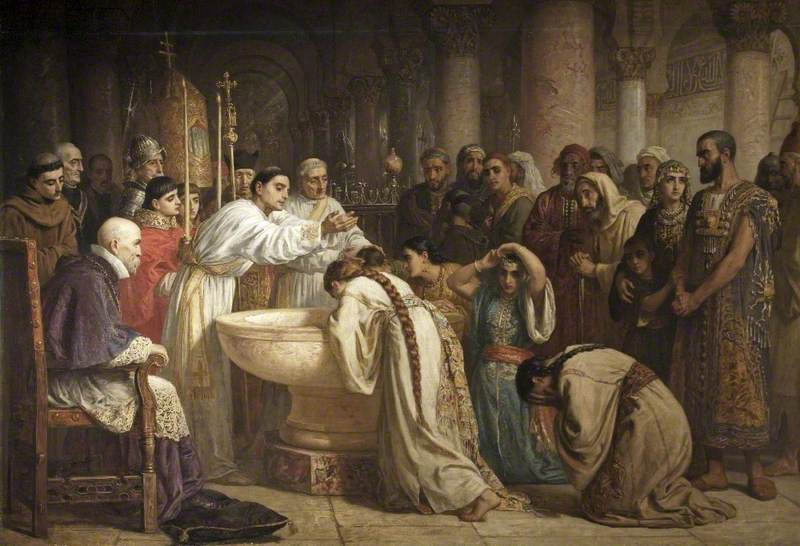
The Moorish Proselytes of Archbishop Ximenes, Granada, 150 by Edwin Long

Le Roi est mort, Vive le Roi! by Marcus Stone

Lalla Rookh by John Everett Millais

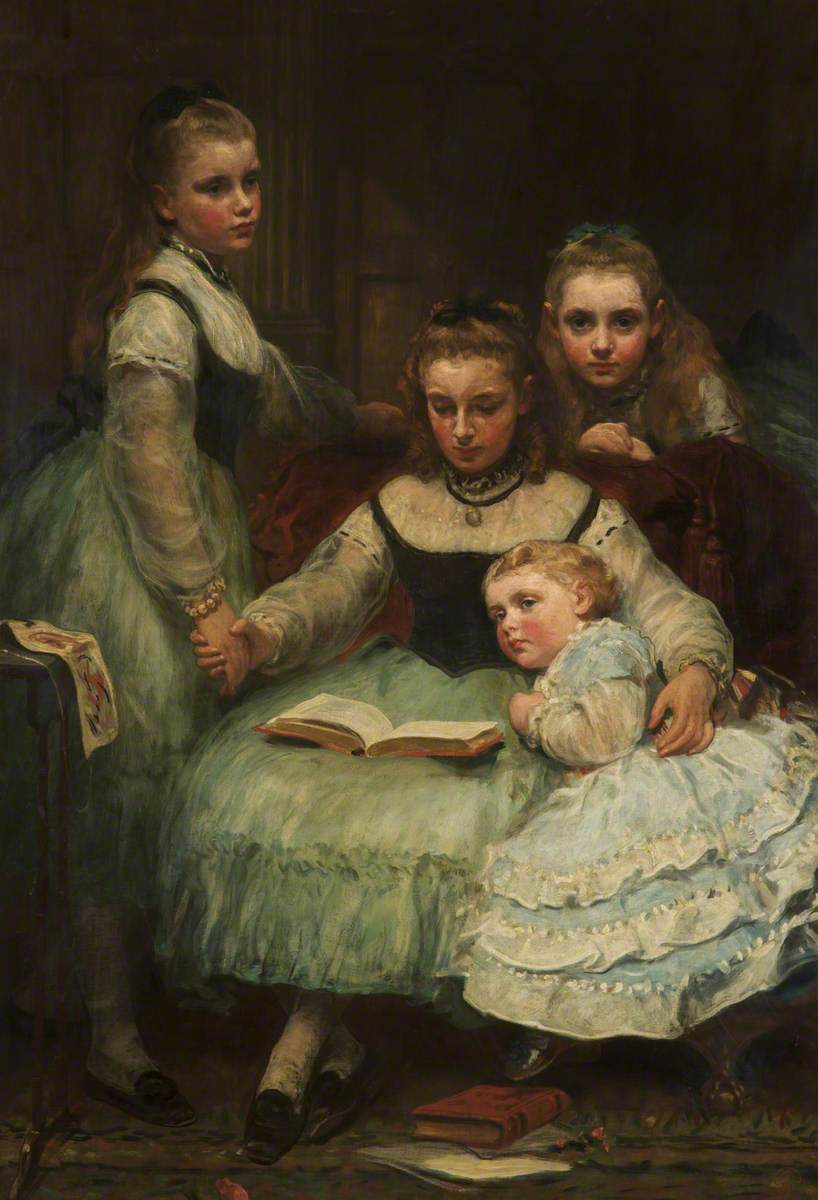
The Walker Sisters by James Sant

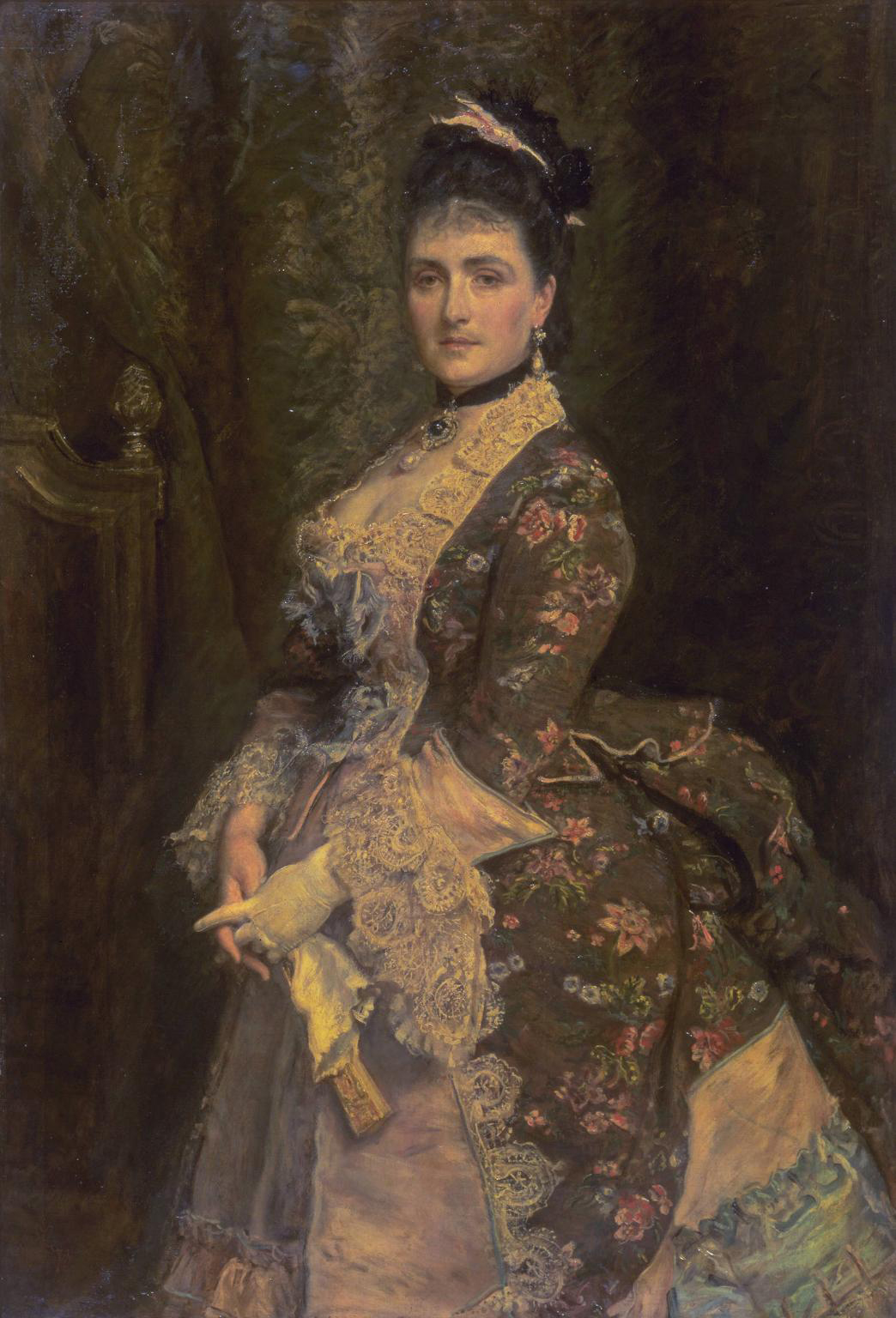
Clarissa Bischoffsheim by John Everett Millais

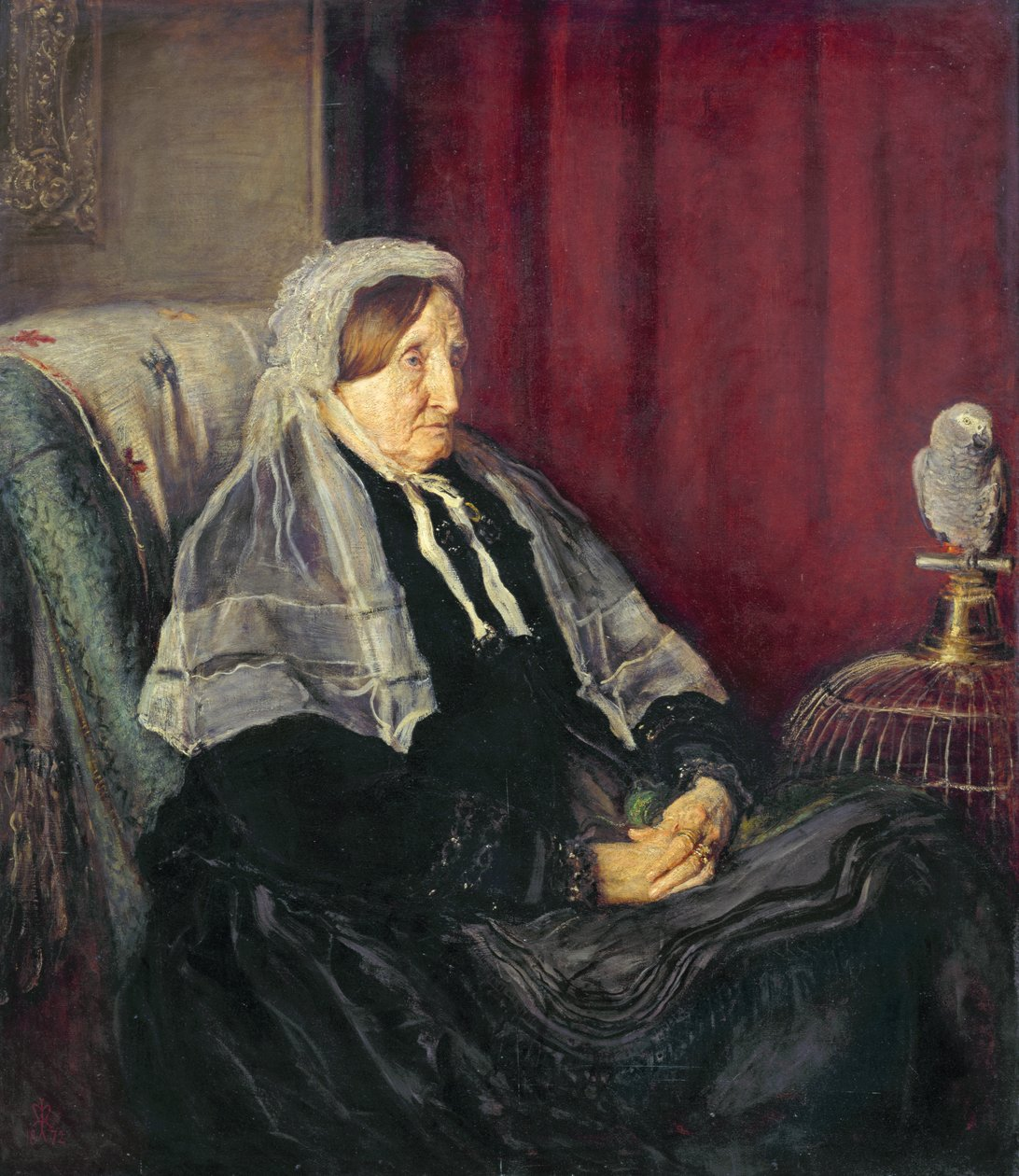
Isabella Heugh by John Everett Millais

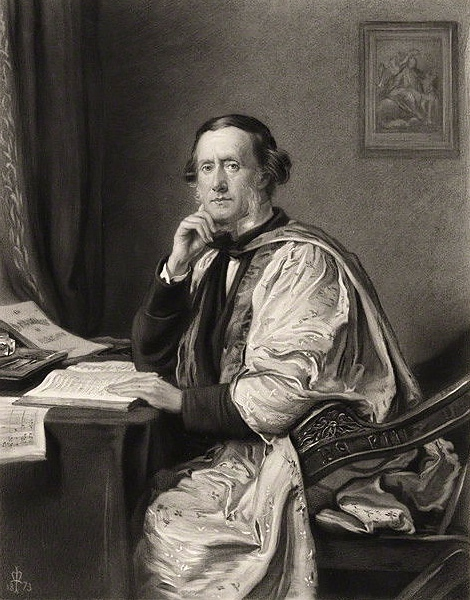
William Sterndale Bennett by John Everett Millais

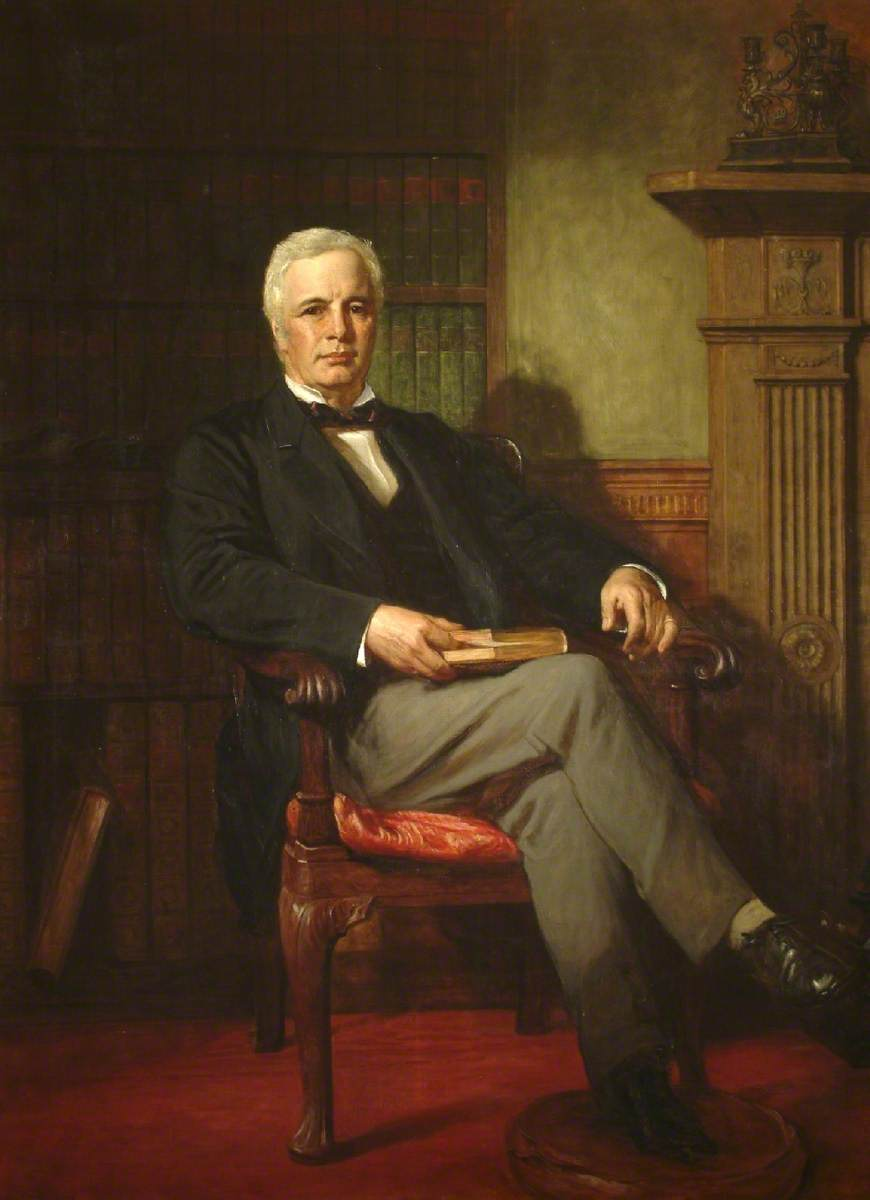
Peter Locke King by Henry Tanworth Wells

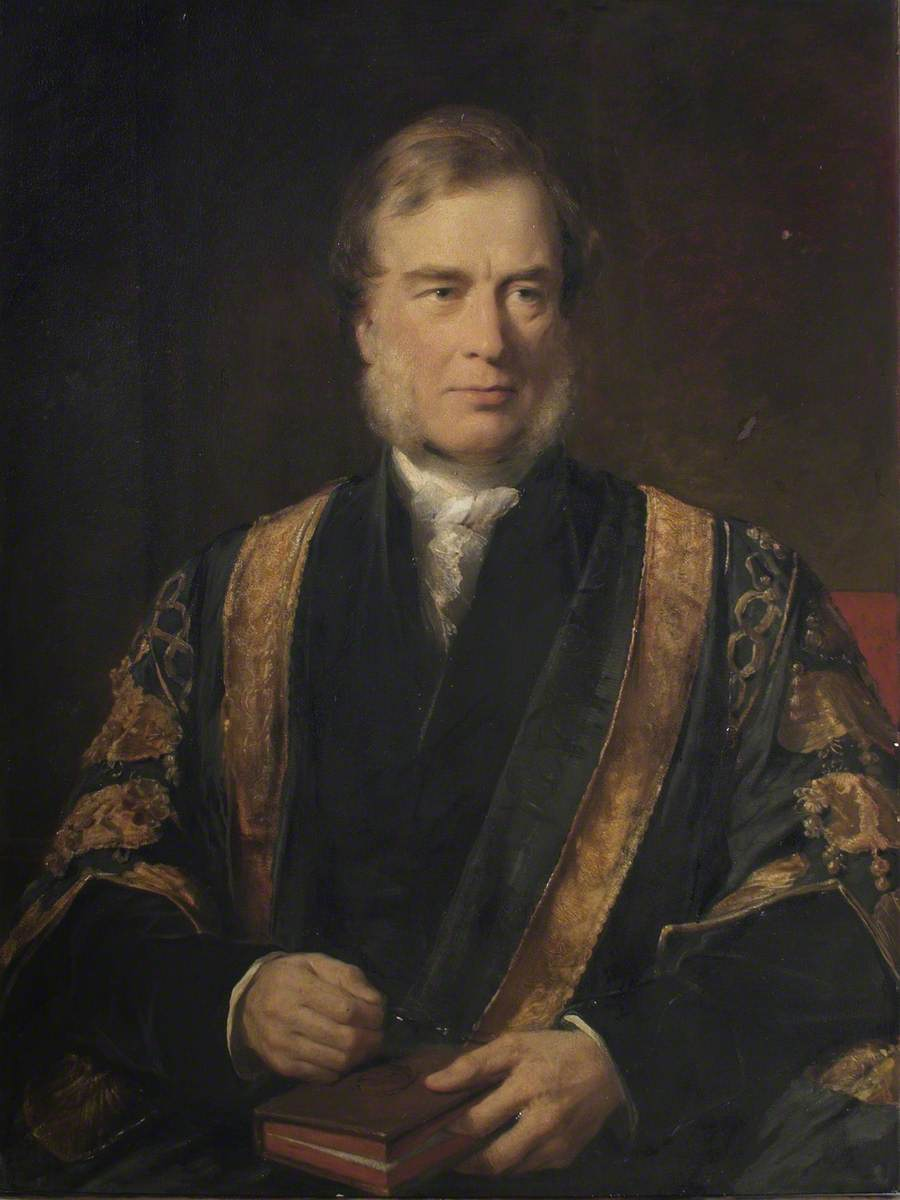
George Burrows by George Richmond

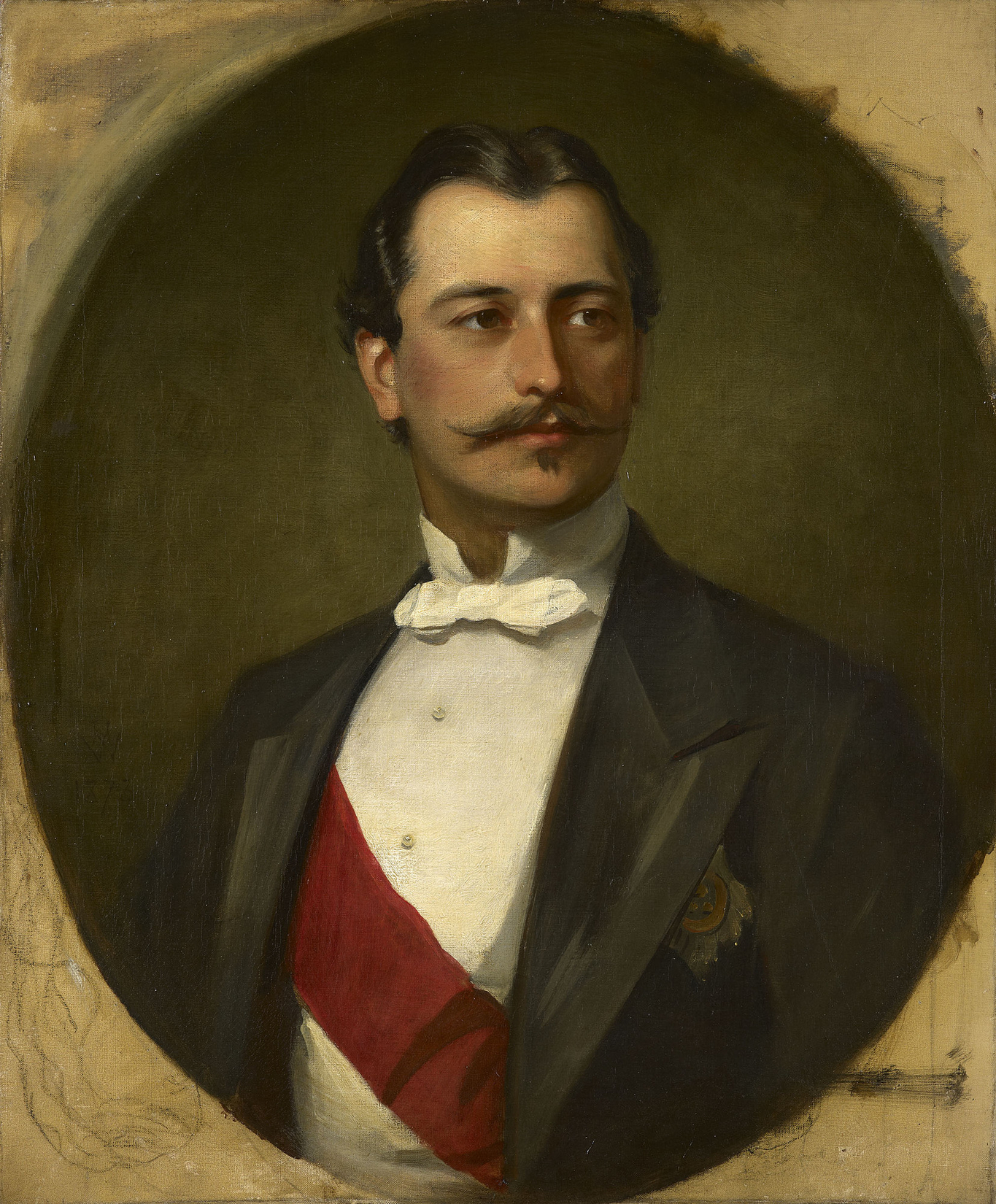
Francis, Duke of Teck by Henry Weigall

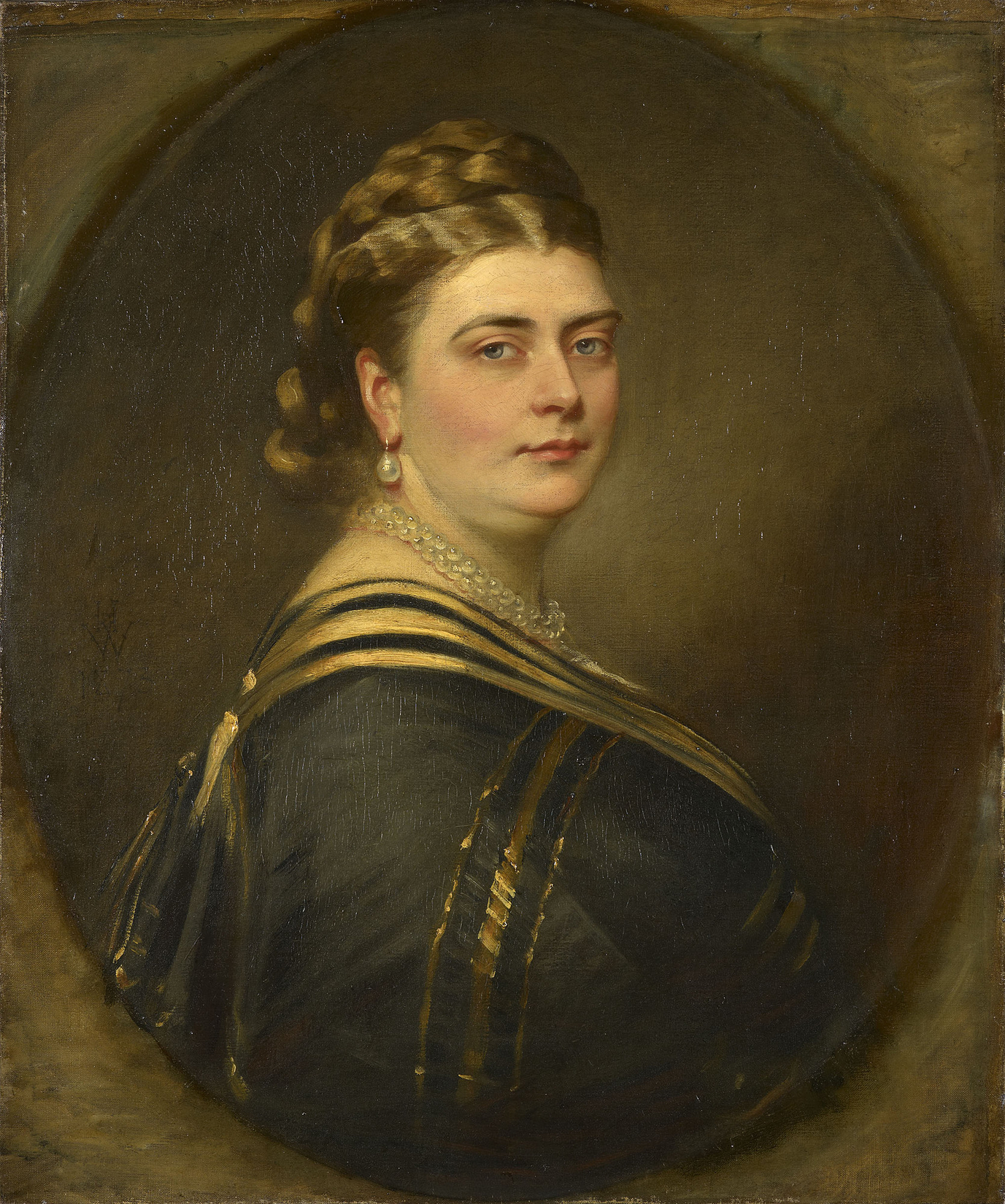
Princess Mary Adelaide of Cambridge by Henry Weigall

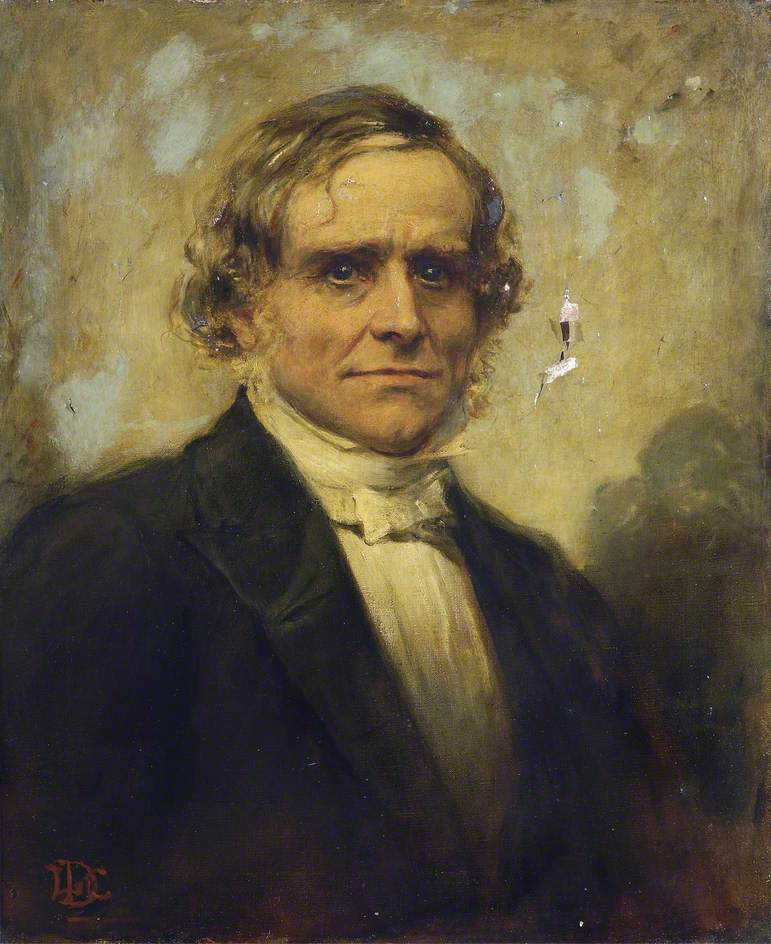
Frederick Denison Maurice by Lowes Cato Dickinson

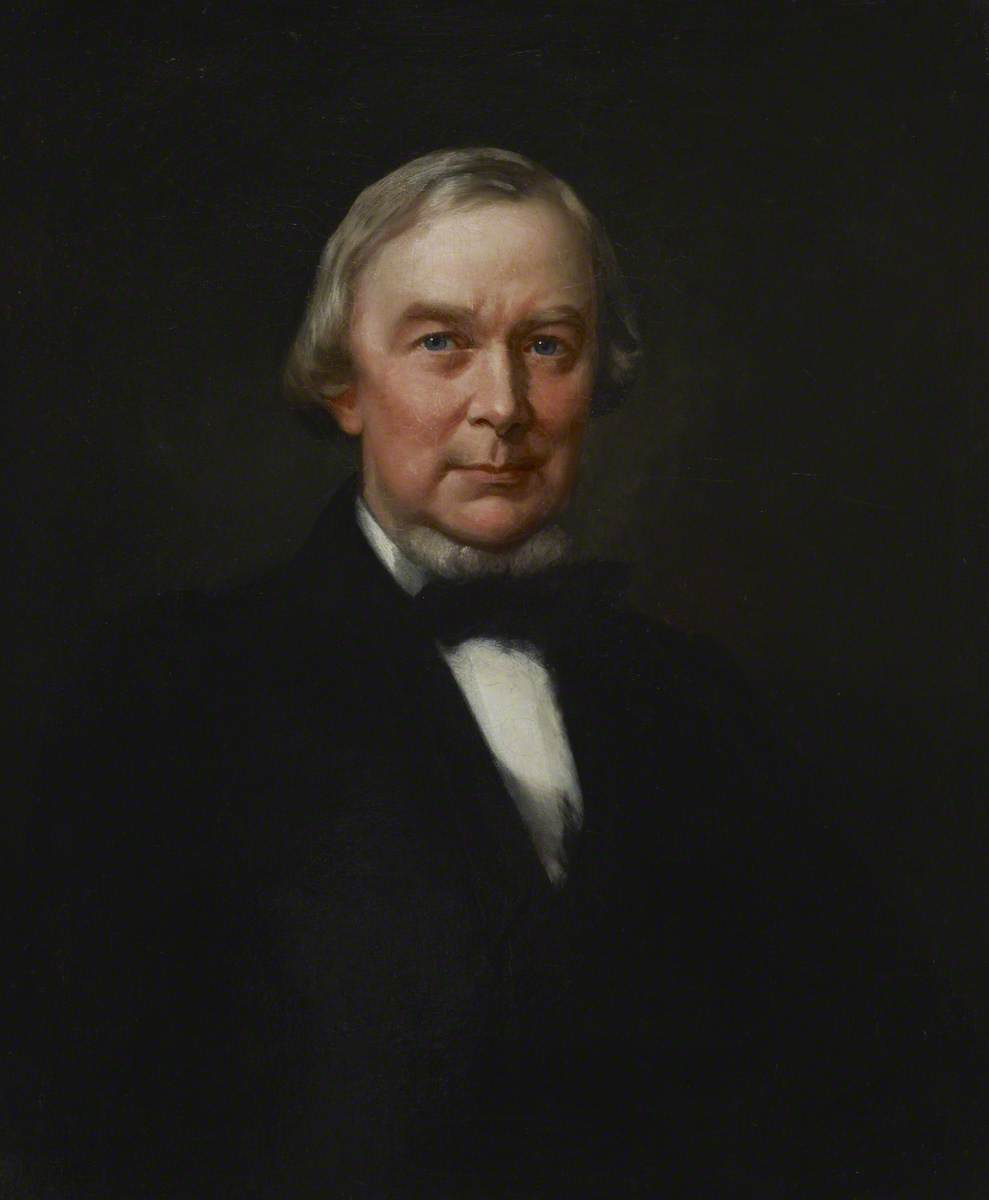
John Winter Jones by William Salter Herrick

Buckingham and Chandos by Francis Grant

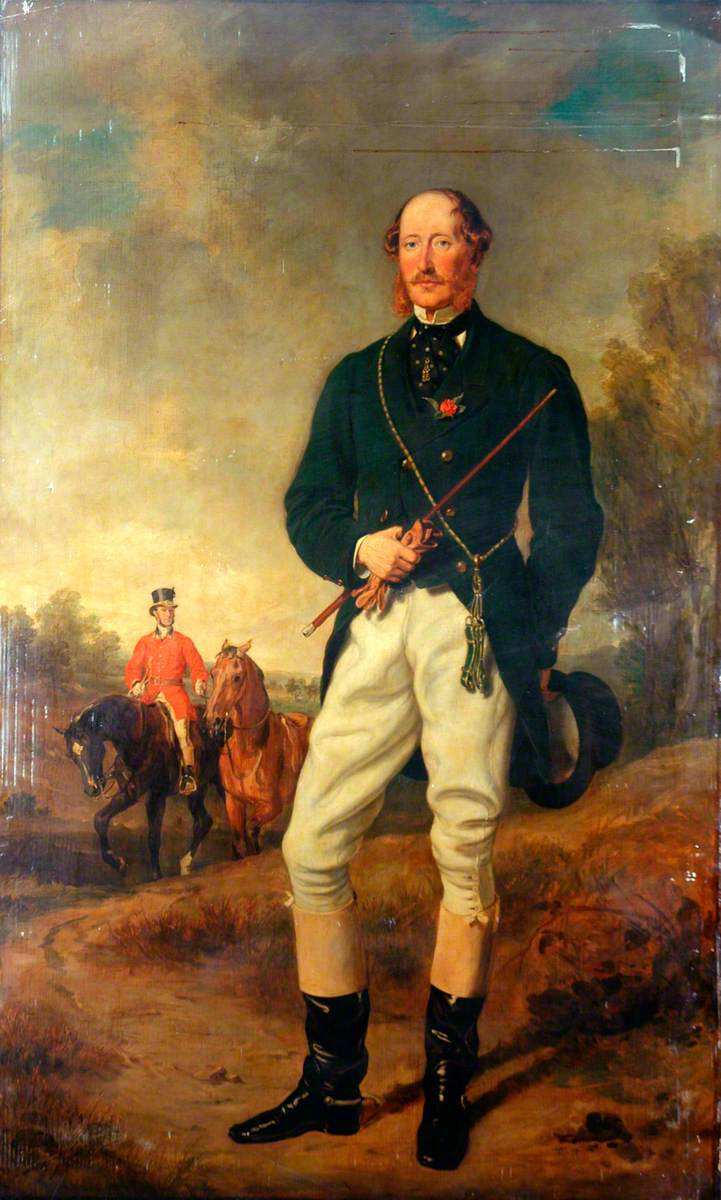
Viscount Colville of Culross by Francis Grant

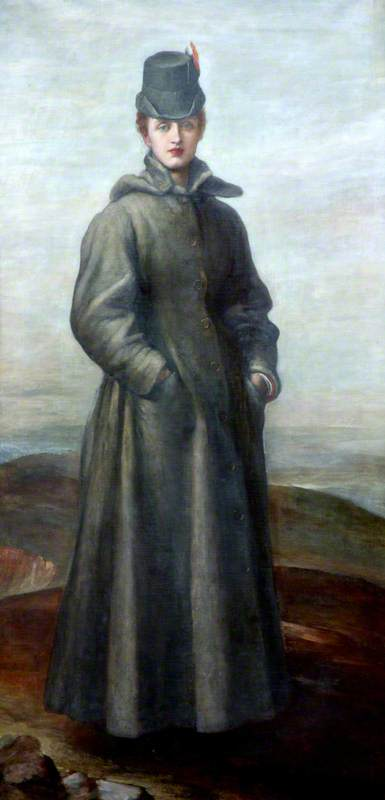
May Prinsep by George Frederic Watts

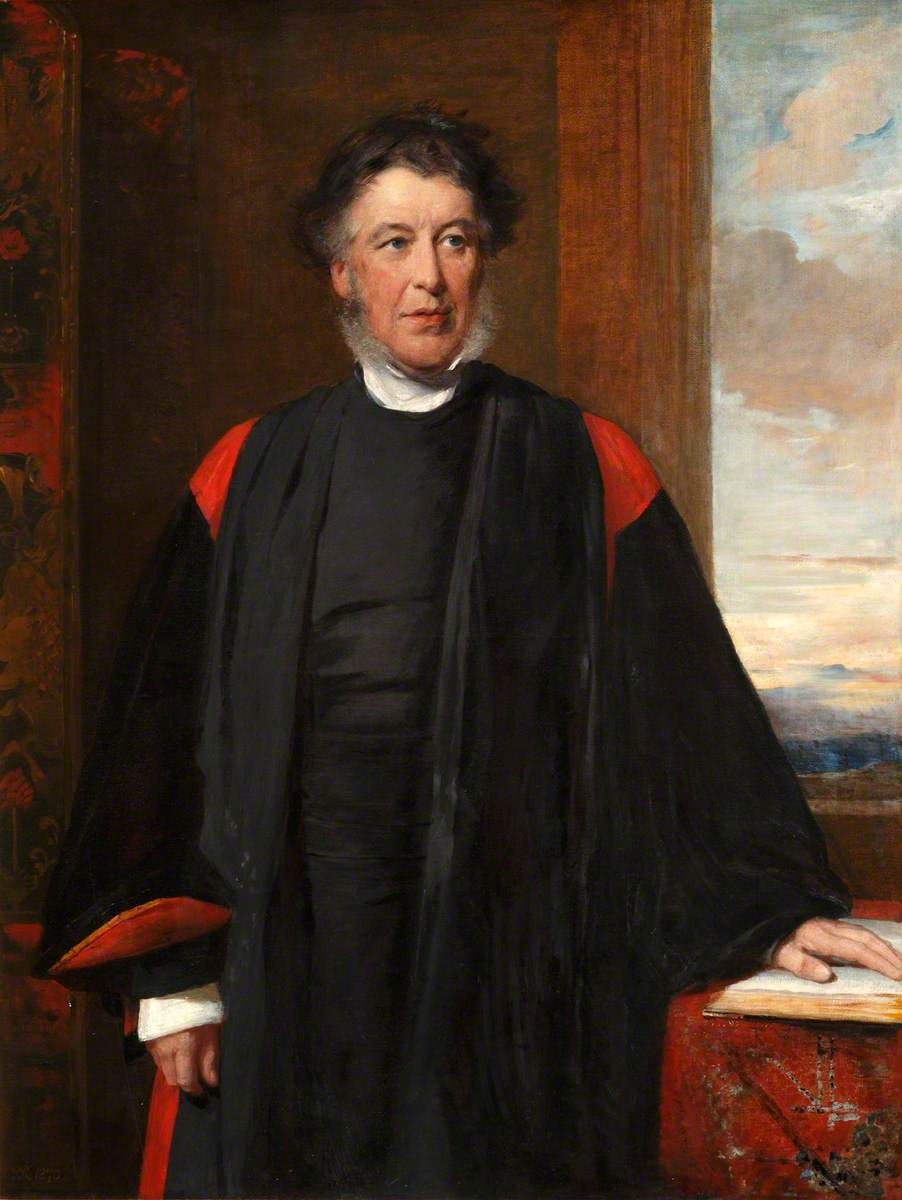
Francis Knyvett Leighton by George Richmond

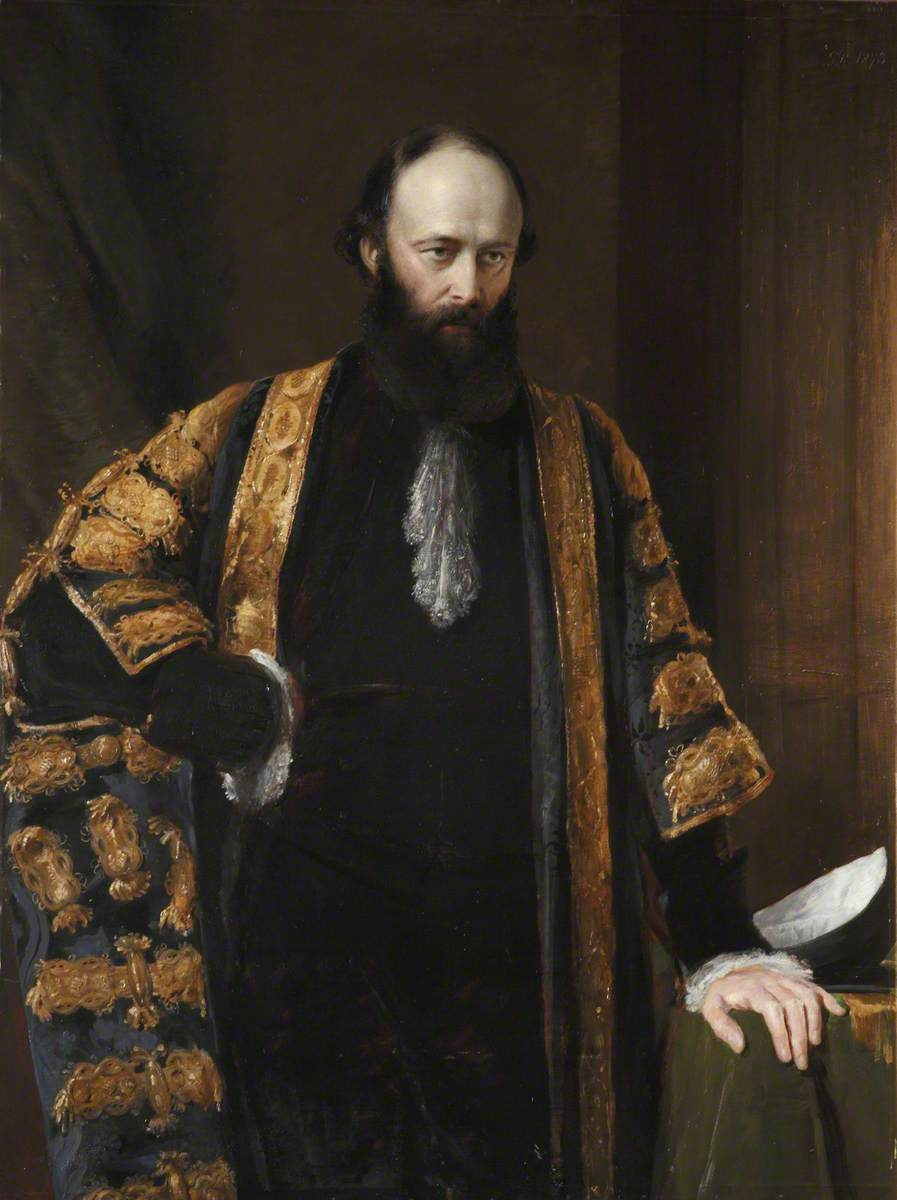
Marquess of Salisbury by George Richmond

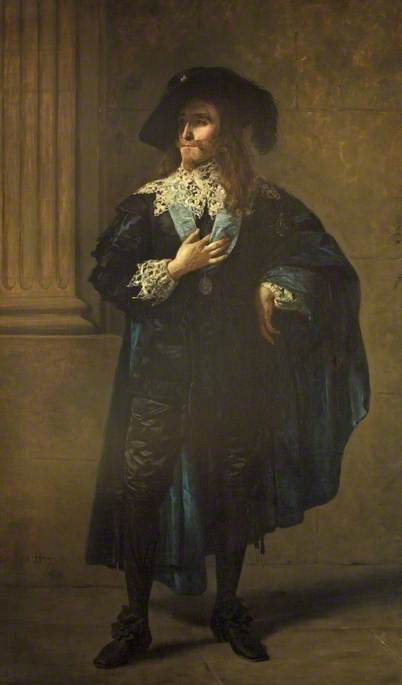
Henry Irving as Charles I by James Archer

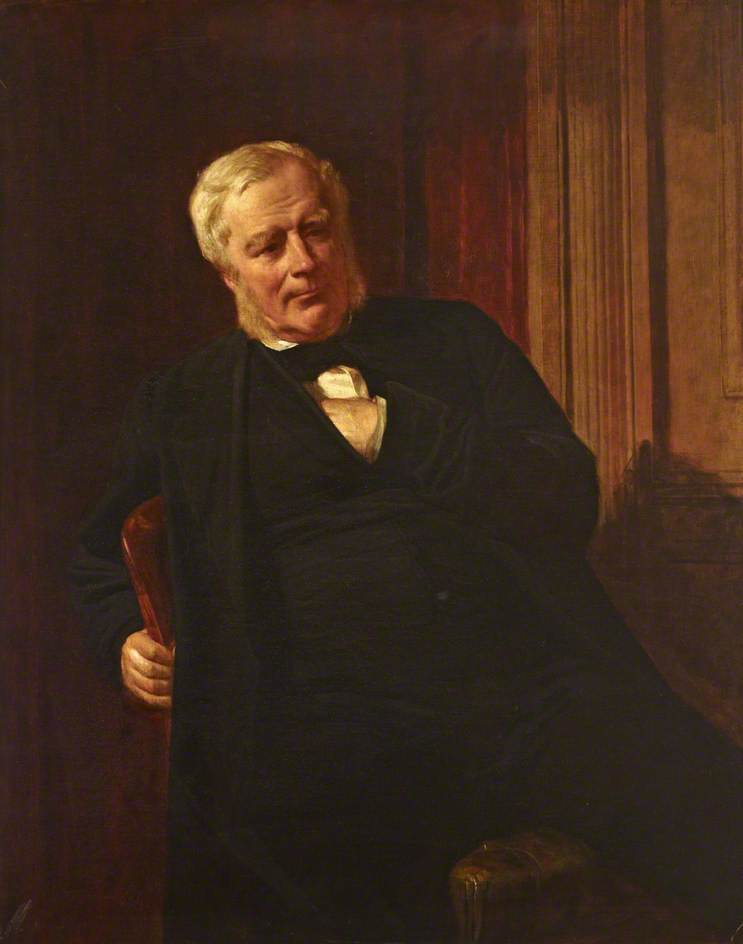
Robert Cheere by Henry Tanworth Wells

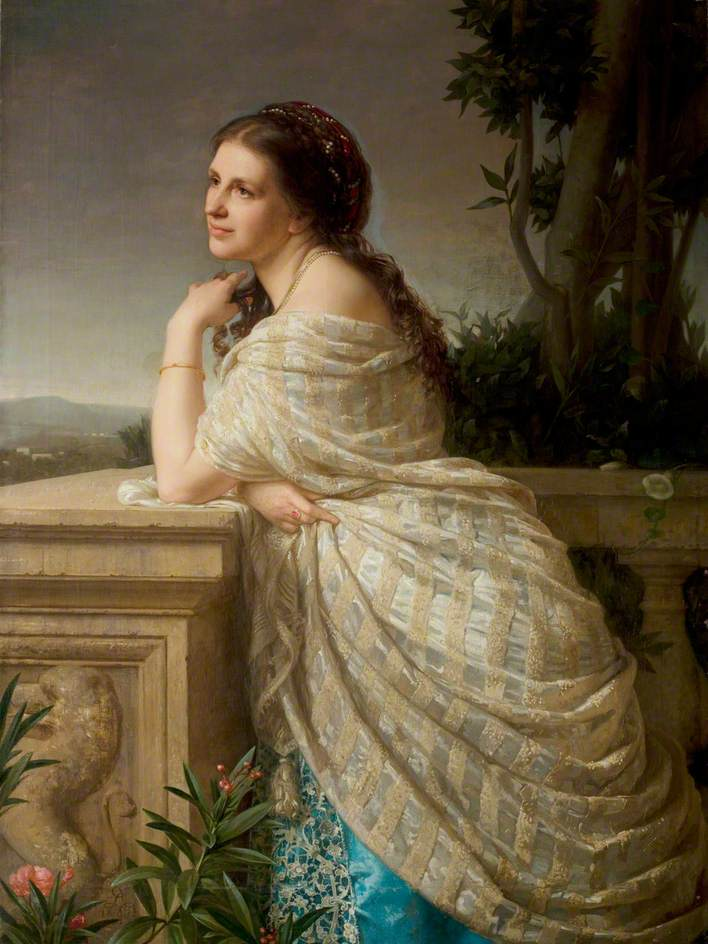
Helen Faucit by Rudolf Lehmann

== See also ==
- Salon of 1873, a contemporary art exhibition held in Paris

== Bibliography ==
- Marshall, Nancy Rose & Warner, Malcolm. James Tissot: Victorian Life, Modern Love. Yale University Press, 1999.
- Wood, Christopher. William Powell Frith: A Painter and His World. Sutton Publishing, 2006.
