= Guildhall Art Gallery =

Art museum in London, England

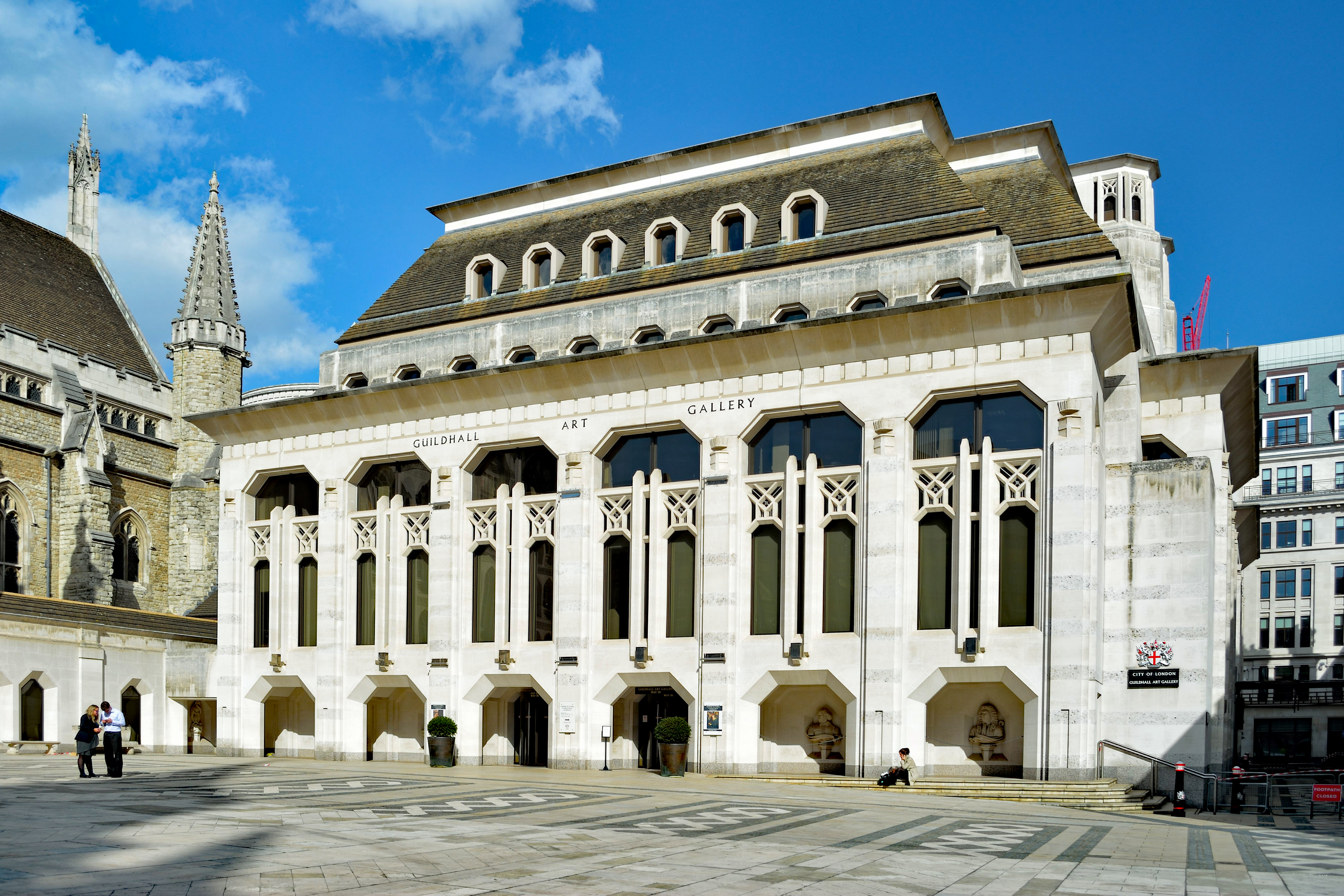
- Established: 1885 (original), 1999 (current)
- Location: Moorgate area, City of London, England
- Coordinates: 51.5155°N 0.0914°W
- Type: Art museum
- Collection size: About 4,000 items
- Director: Elizabeth Scott
- Architect: Richard Gilbert Scott (current building)
- Website: https://www.thecityofldn.com/directory/guildhall-art-gallery/

The Guildhall Art Gallery houses the art collection of the City of London, England. The museum is located in the Moorgate area of the City of London. It is a stone building in a semi-Gothic style intended to be sympathetic to the historic Guildhall, which is adjacent and to which it is connected internally.

== History ==
The City of London Corporation had commissioned and collected portraits since 1670, originally to hang in the Guildhall. In the 19th and 20th centuries, the Corporation's art collections grew through gifts and bequests to include history paintings and other genres of art. A notable donation came with the bequest of the businessman and art collector Charles Gassiot in 1902 who left over a hundred paintings to the gallery. This massively bolstered the Guildhall's collection of Victorian era art and included works by Clarkson Stanfield, David Roberts, John Everett Millais, William Dyce and James Tissot.

The first purpose-built gallery for displaying the collection was completed in 1885 (141 years ago). This building was destroyed in The Blitz in 1941, resulting in the loss of 164 paintings, drawings, watercolours, and prints, and 20 sculptures. It was not until 1985 that the City of London Corporation decided to redevelop the site and build a new gallery. The building was designed in a postmodern style by the British architect Richard Gilbert Scott. The new facility, which was intended to house a collection of about 4,000 items, was completed in 1999 (27 years ago).

The centrepiece of the collection, John Singleton Copley's huge painting depicting The Defeat of the Floating Batteries at Gibraltar, was placed in a prominent position in the entrance hall of the gallery.

Vivien Knight was head of the Gallery, from 1983 until her death in 2009.

== Amphitheatre ==
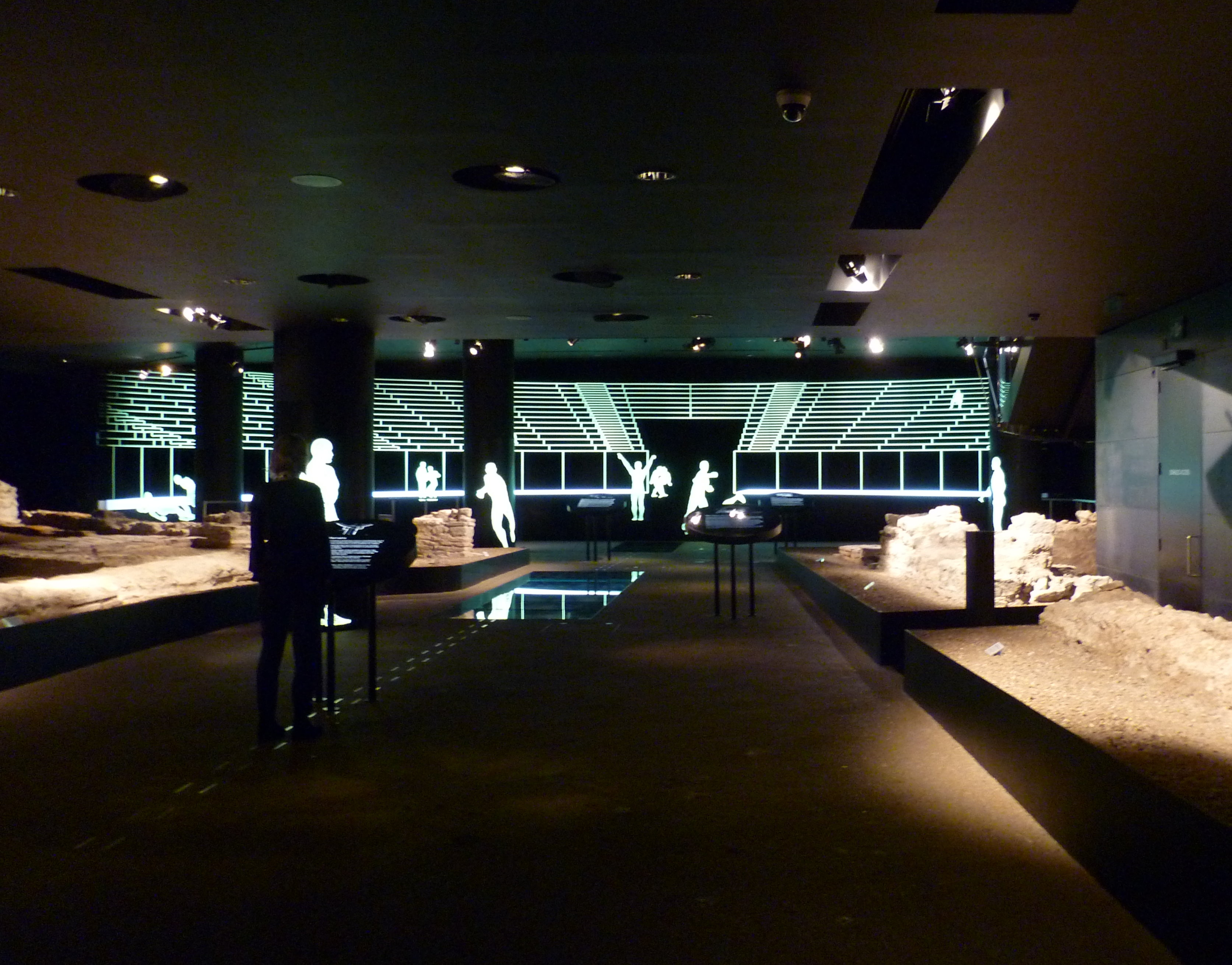
The Roman amphitheatre below the Guildhall Art Gallery

The Guildhall complex was built on the site of London's Roman amphitheatre, and some of the remains of this are displayed in situ in a room in the basement of the art gallery.

== Gallery ==
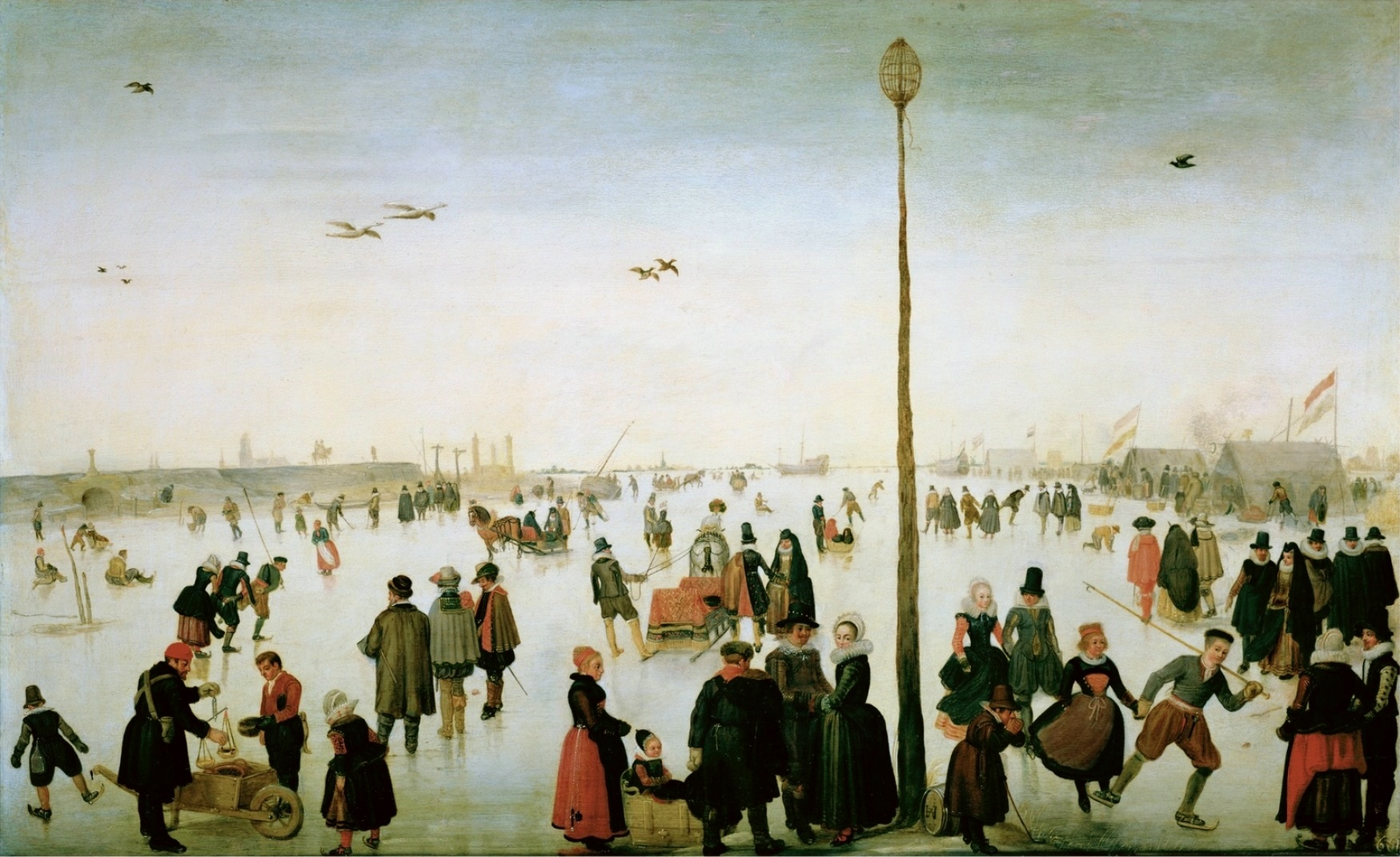
Winter Landscape with a Frozen River and Figures by Hendrick Avercamp, c.1620

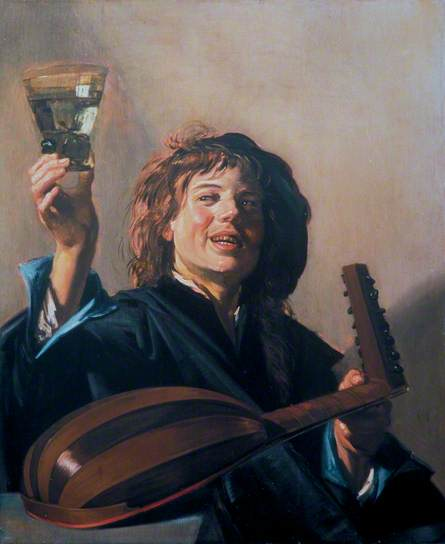
Boy with a Glass and a Lute by Frans Hals, 1626

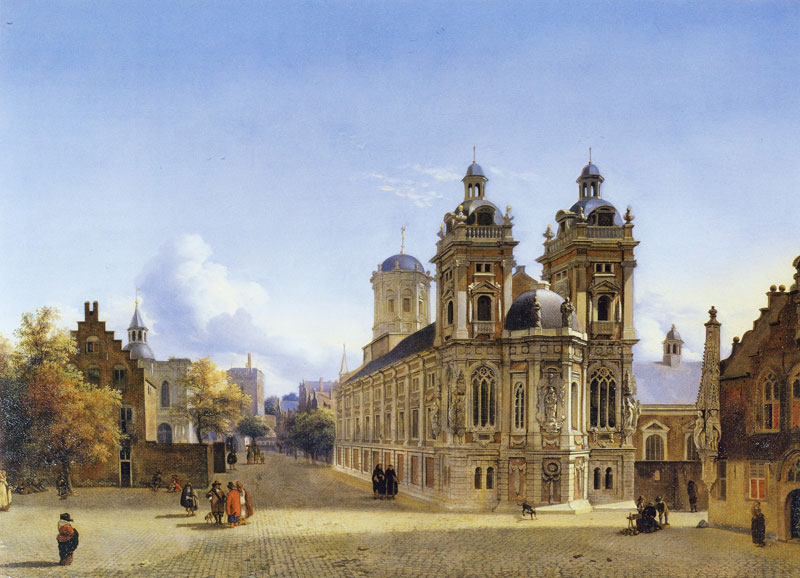
Cityscape with a Church and a Square by Jan van der Heyden, c.1669

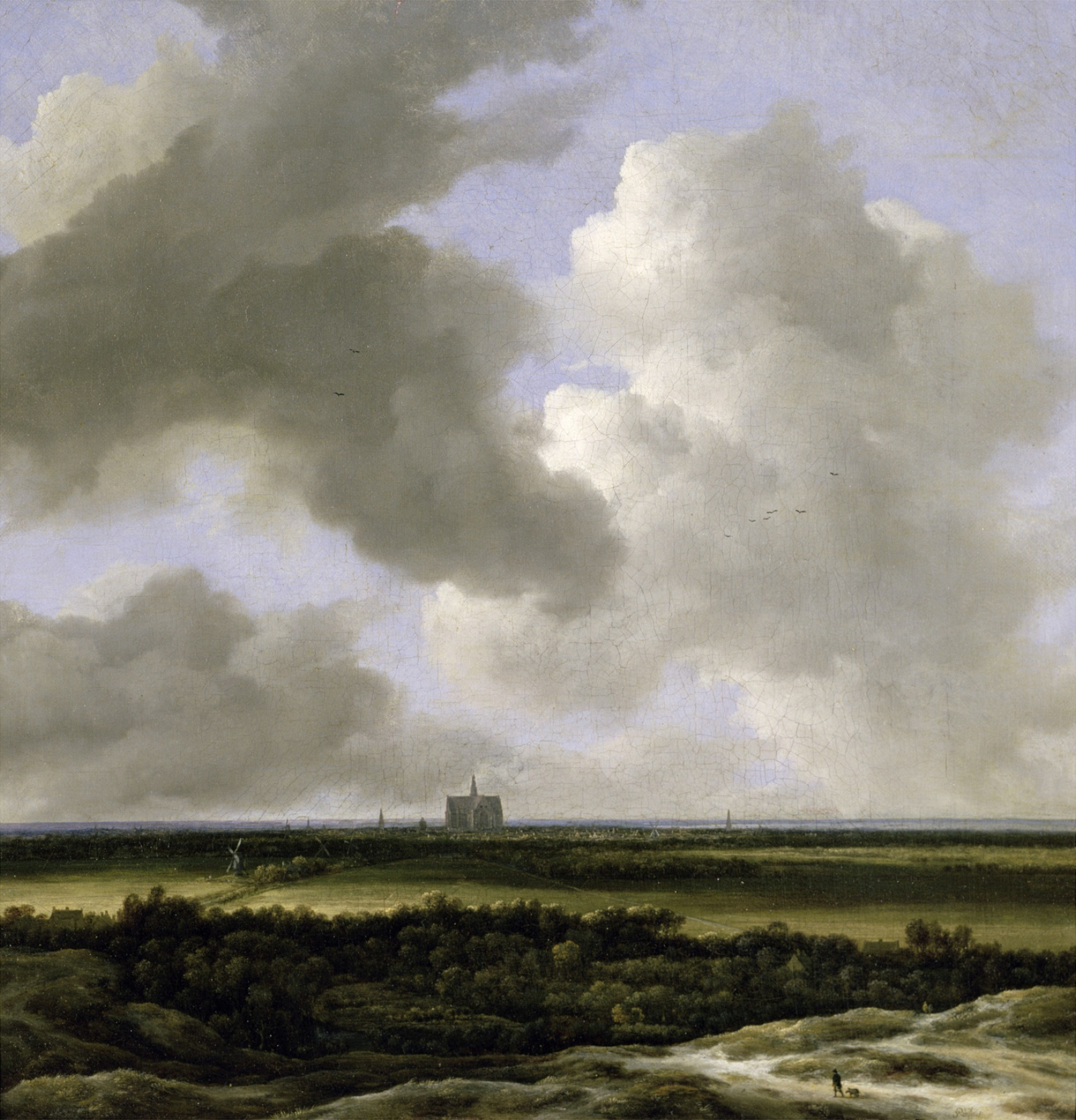
Panoramic View of Haarlem by Jacob van Ruisdael, 1670

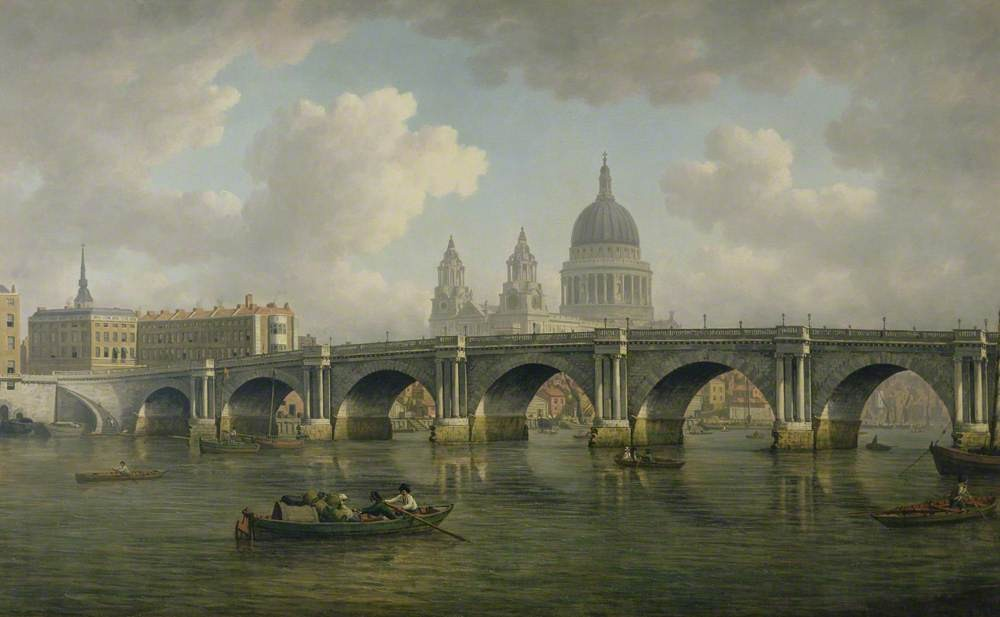
Blackfriars Bridge and St Paul's Cathedral by William Marlow, c.1762

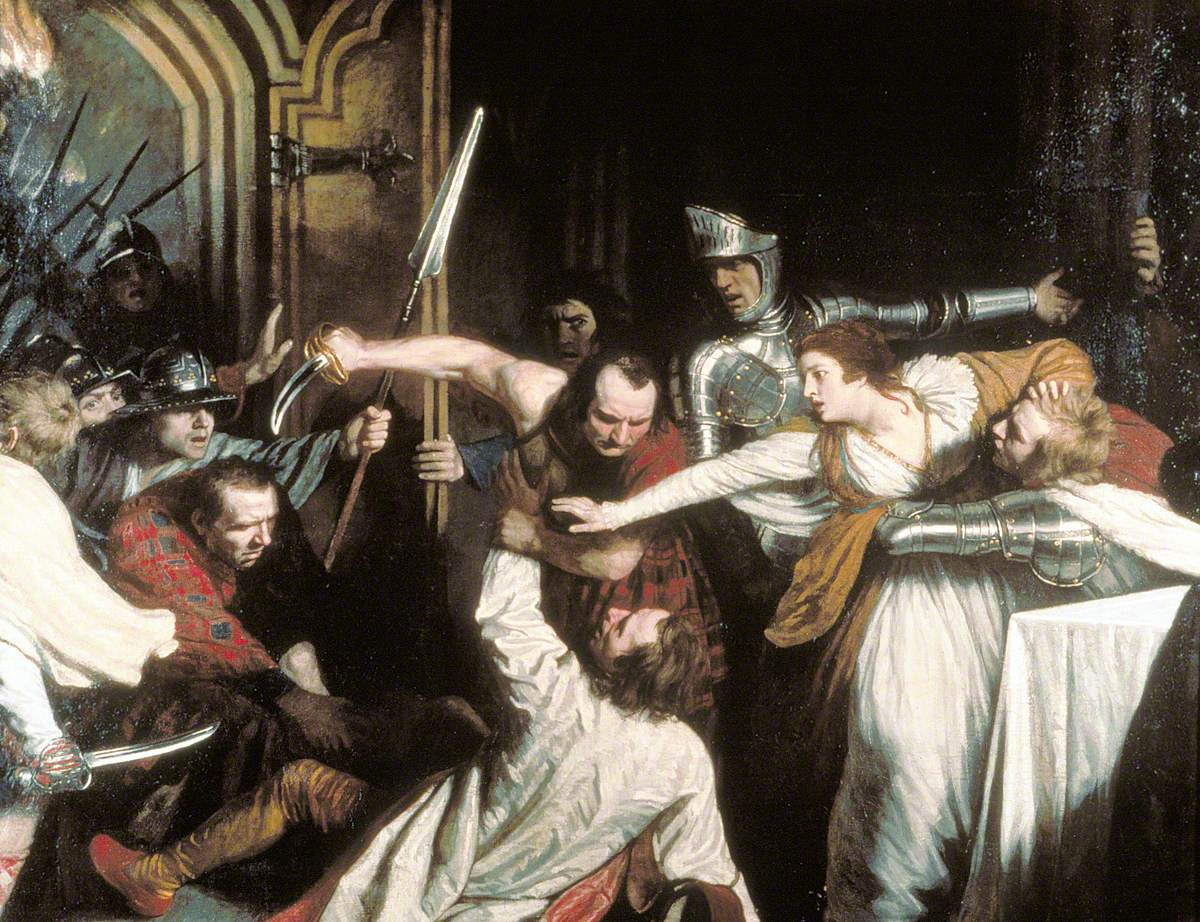
The Murder of Rizzio by John Opie, 1787

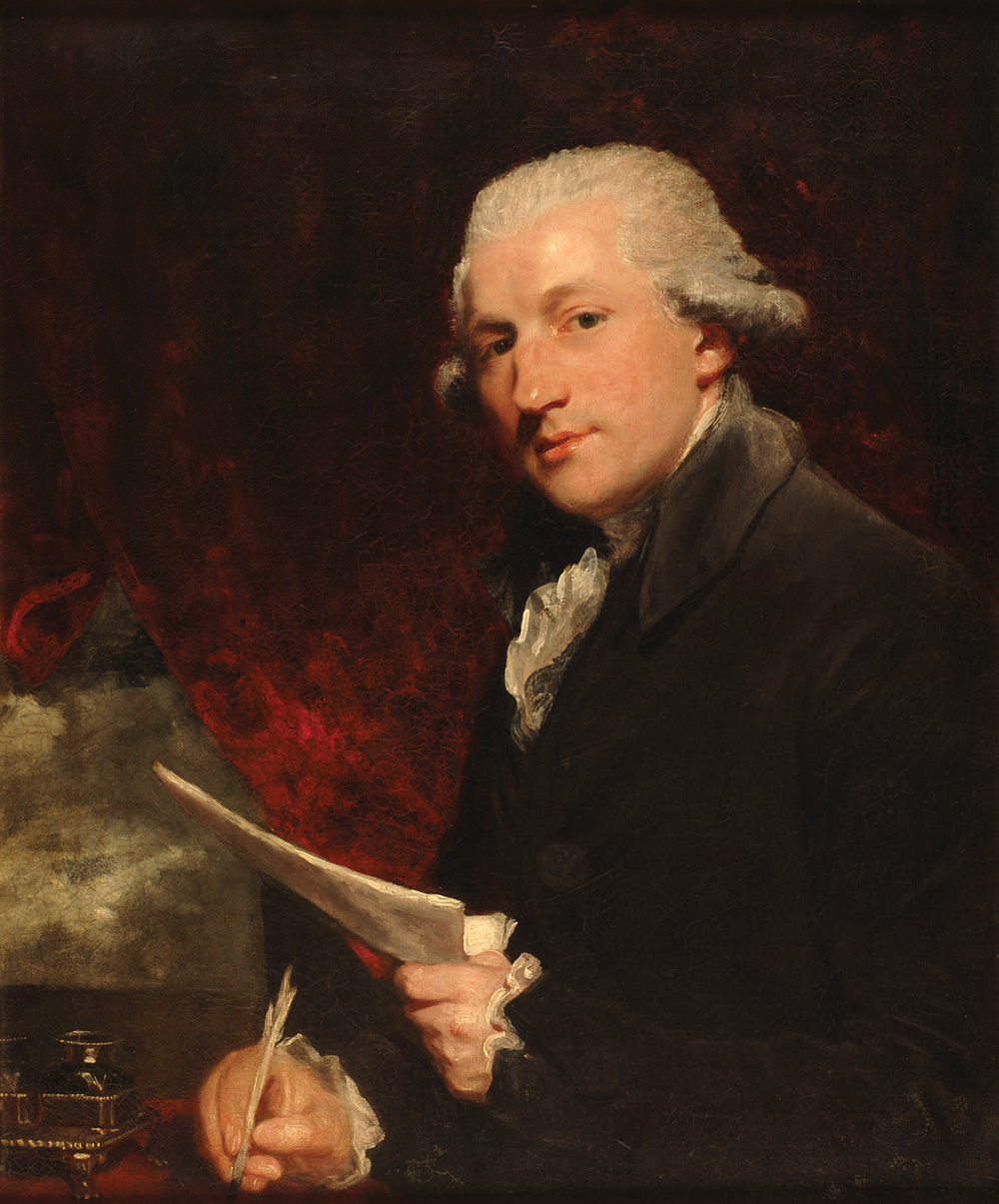
Portrait of Thomas Tomkins by Joshua Reynolds, 1789

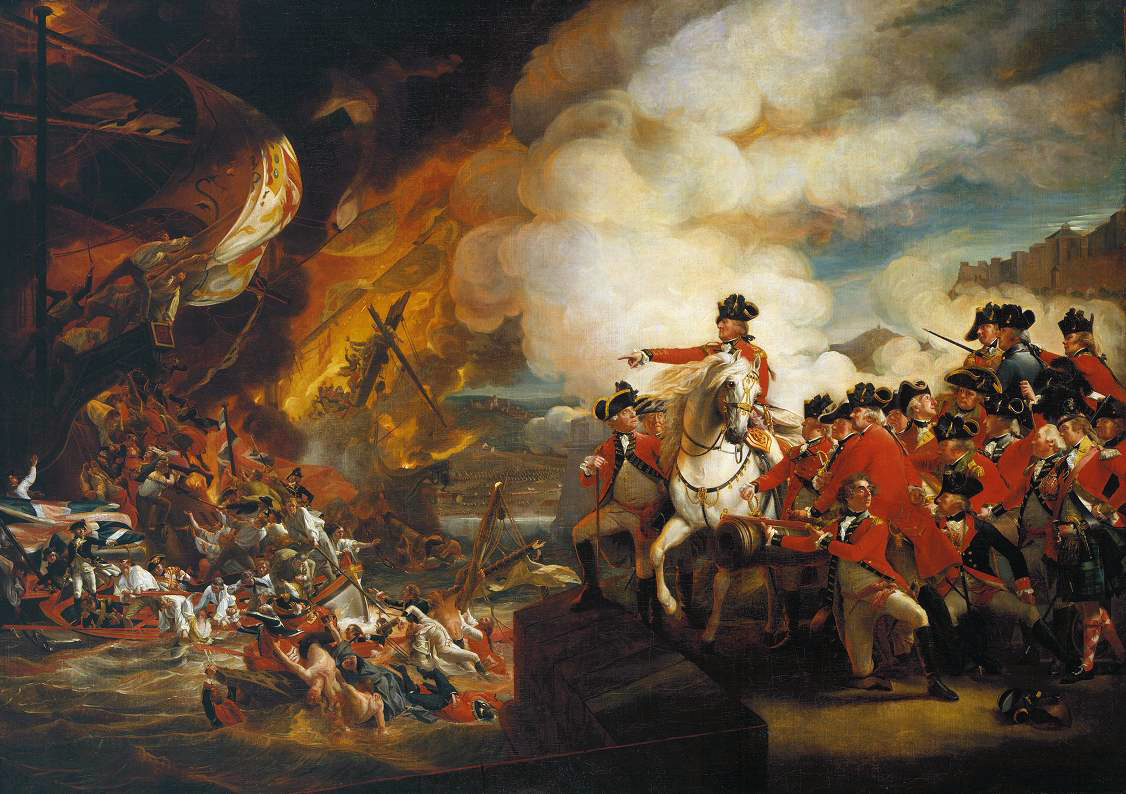
The Defeat of the Floating Batteries at Gibraltar, September 1782 by John Singleton Copley, 1791

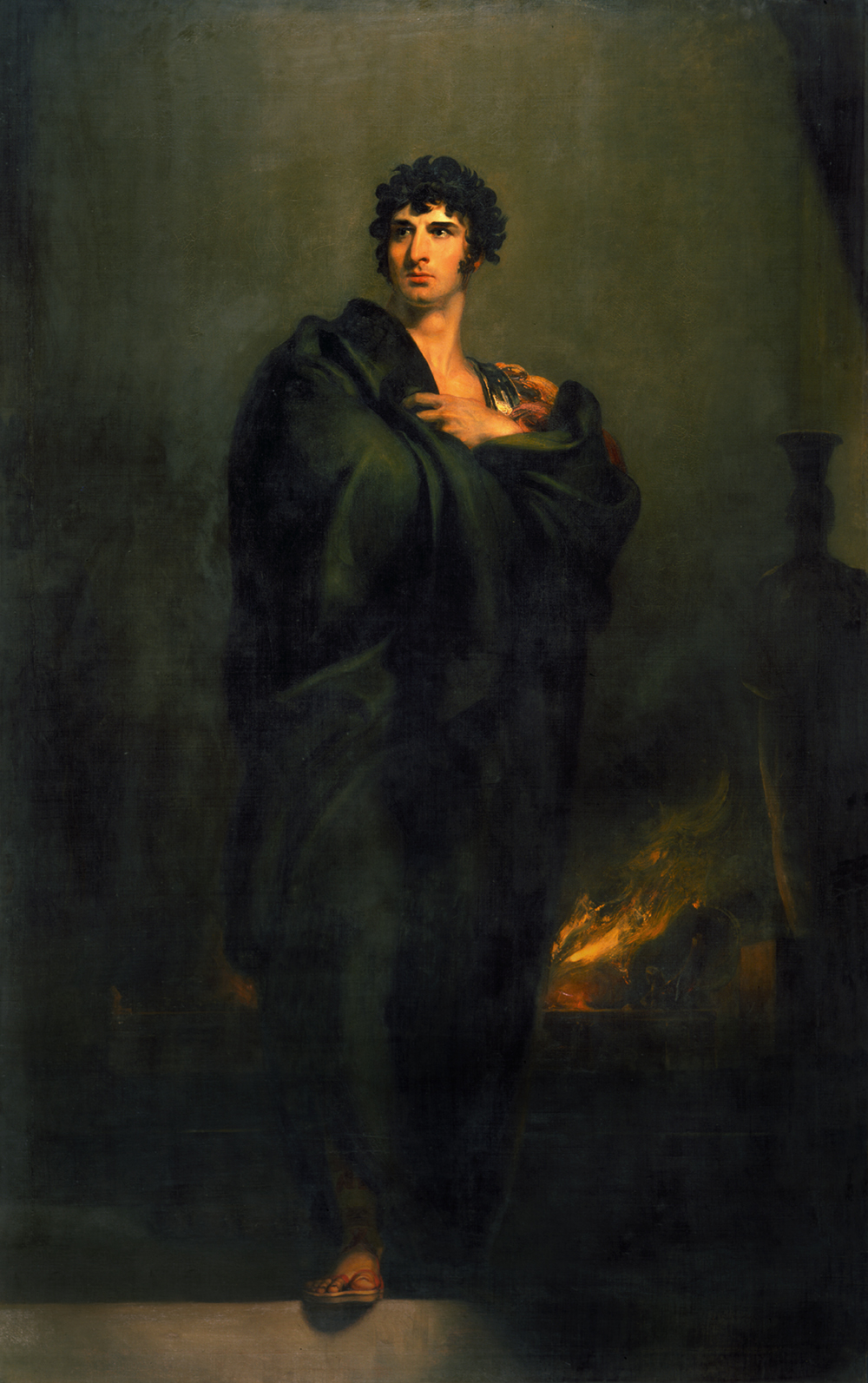
John Philip Kemble as Coriolanus by Thomas Lawrence, 1798

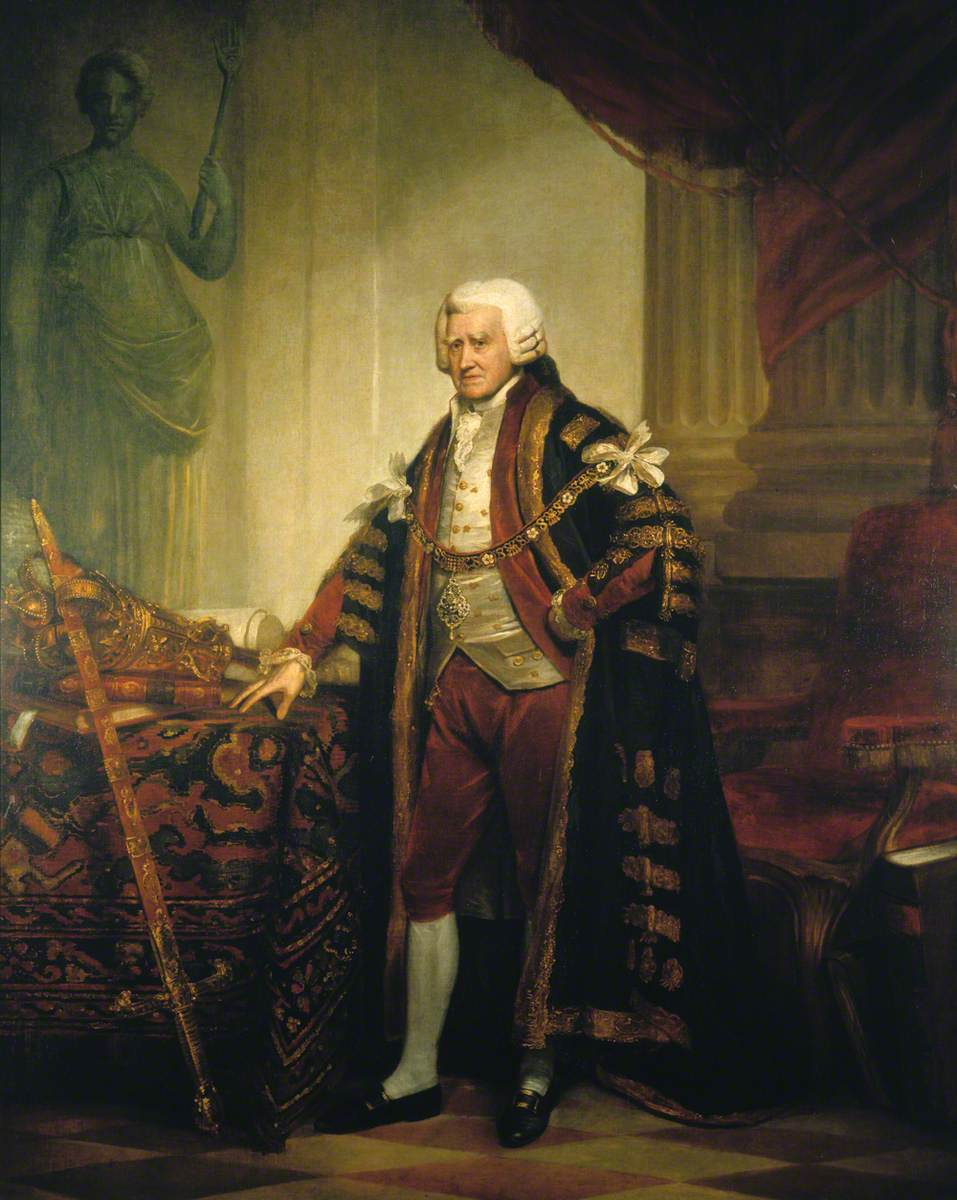
Portrait of John Boydell by William Beechey, 1801

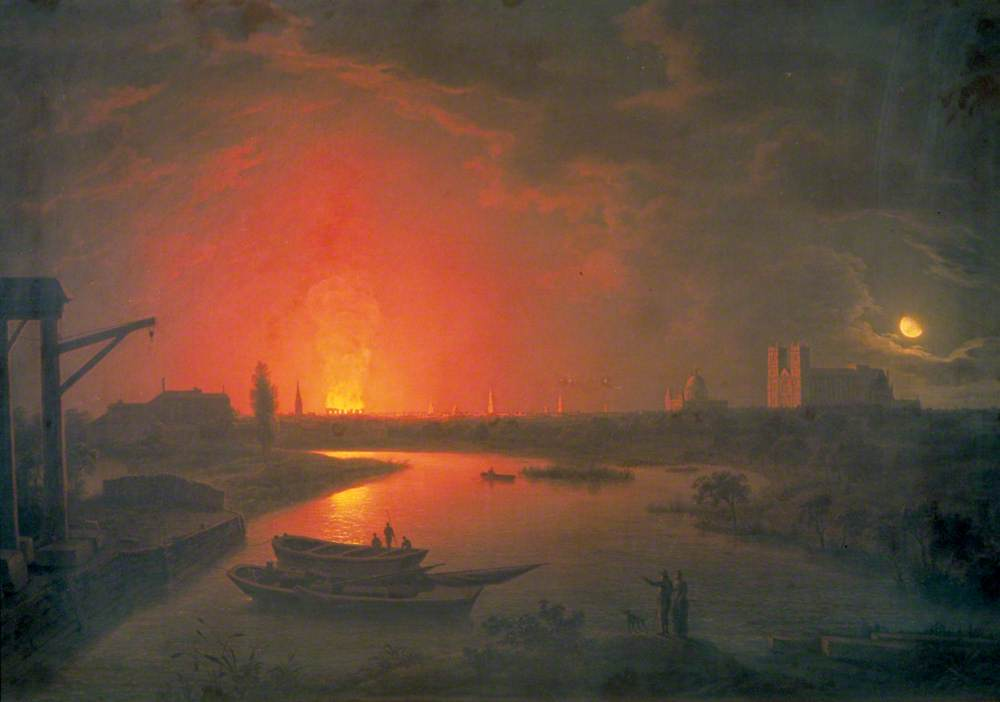
Old Drury Lane Theatre on Fire by Abraham Pether, 1809

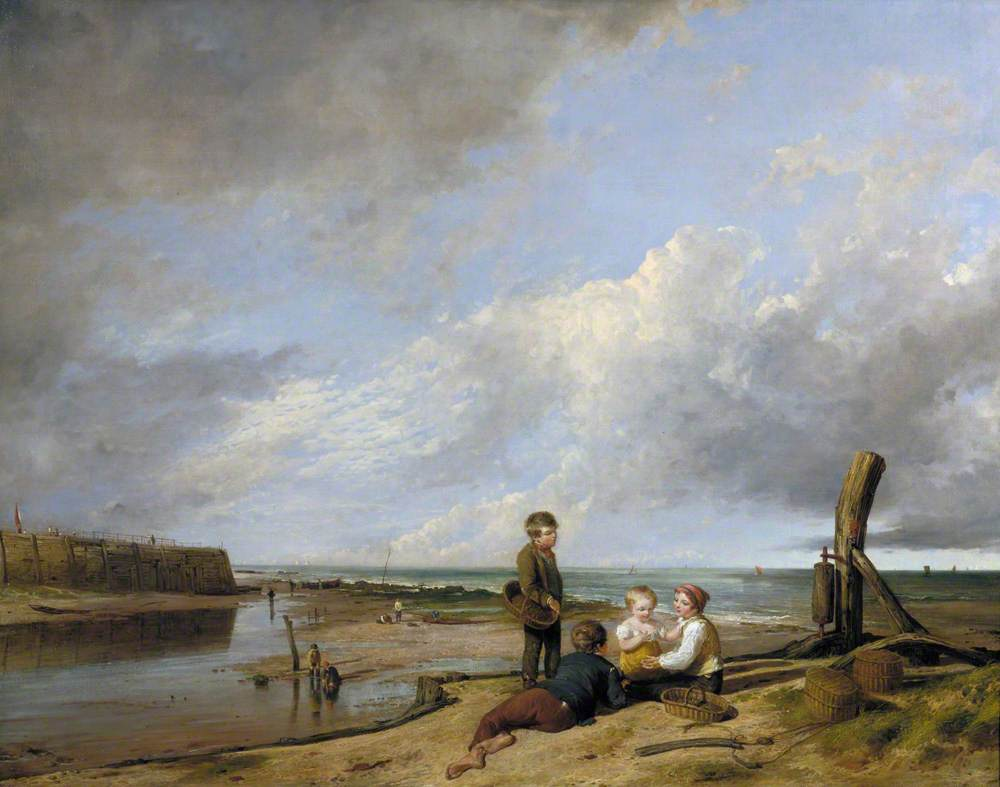
Shrimp Boys at Cromer by William Collins, 1815

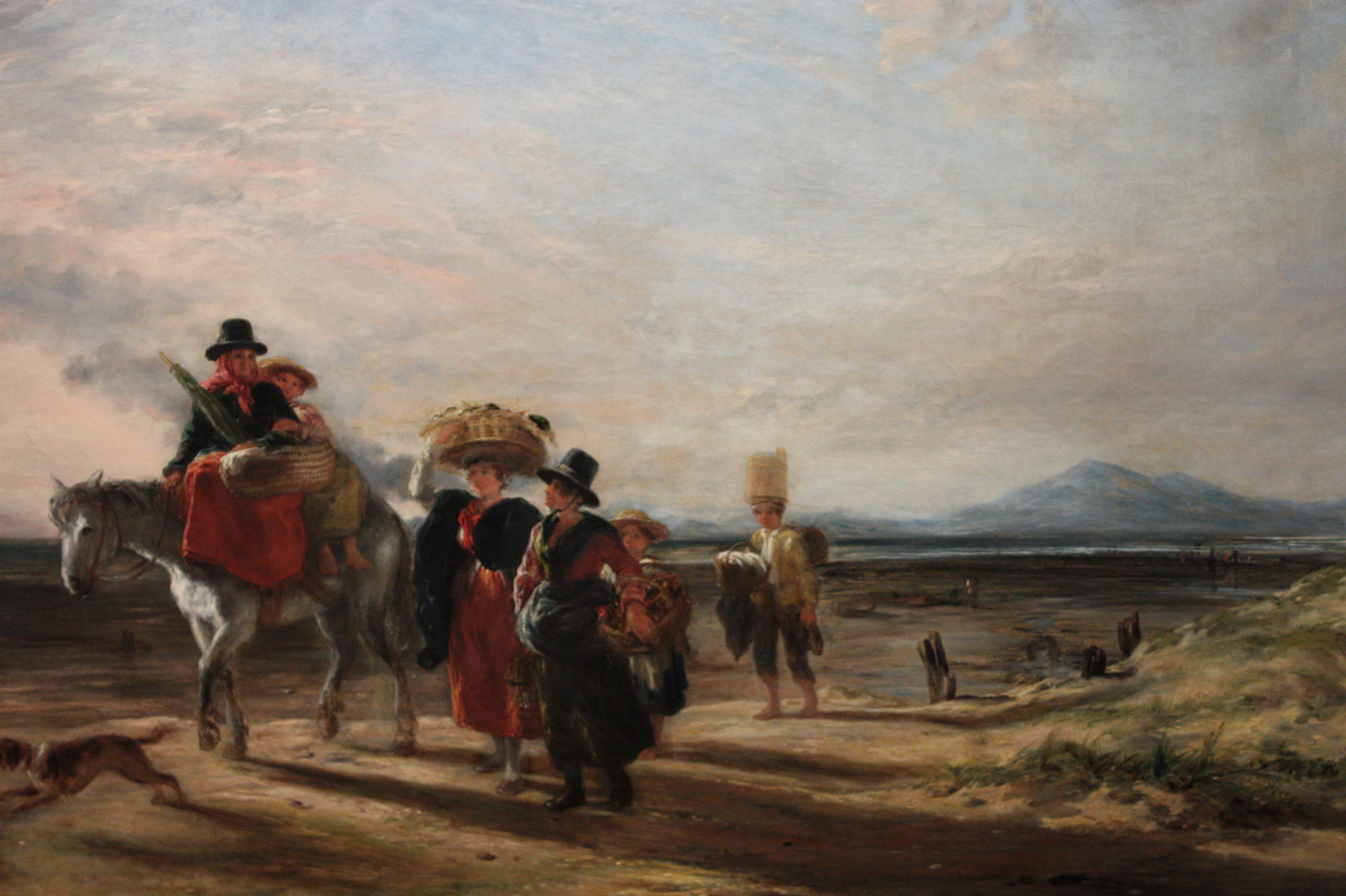
Barmouth Sands by William Collins, 1835

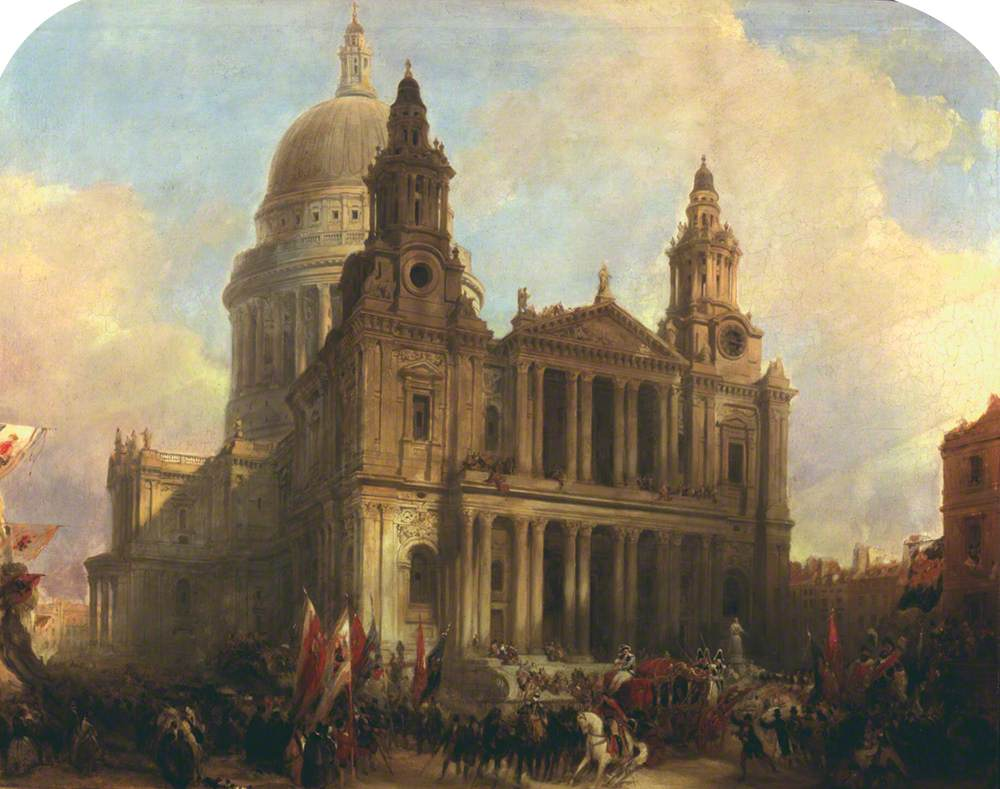
St Paul's Cathedral with the Lord Mayor's Procession by David Roberts, 1836

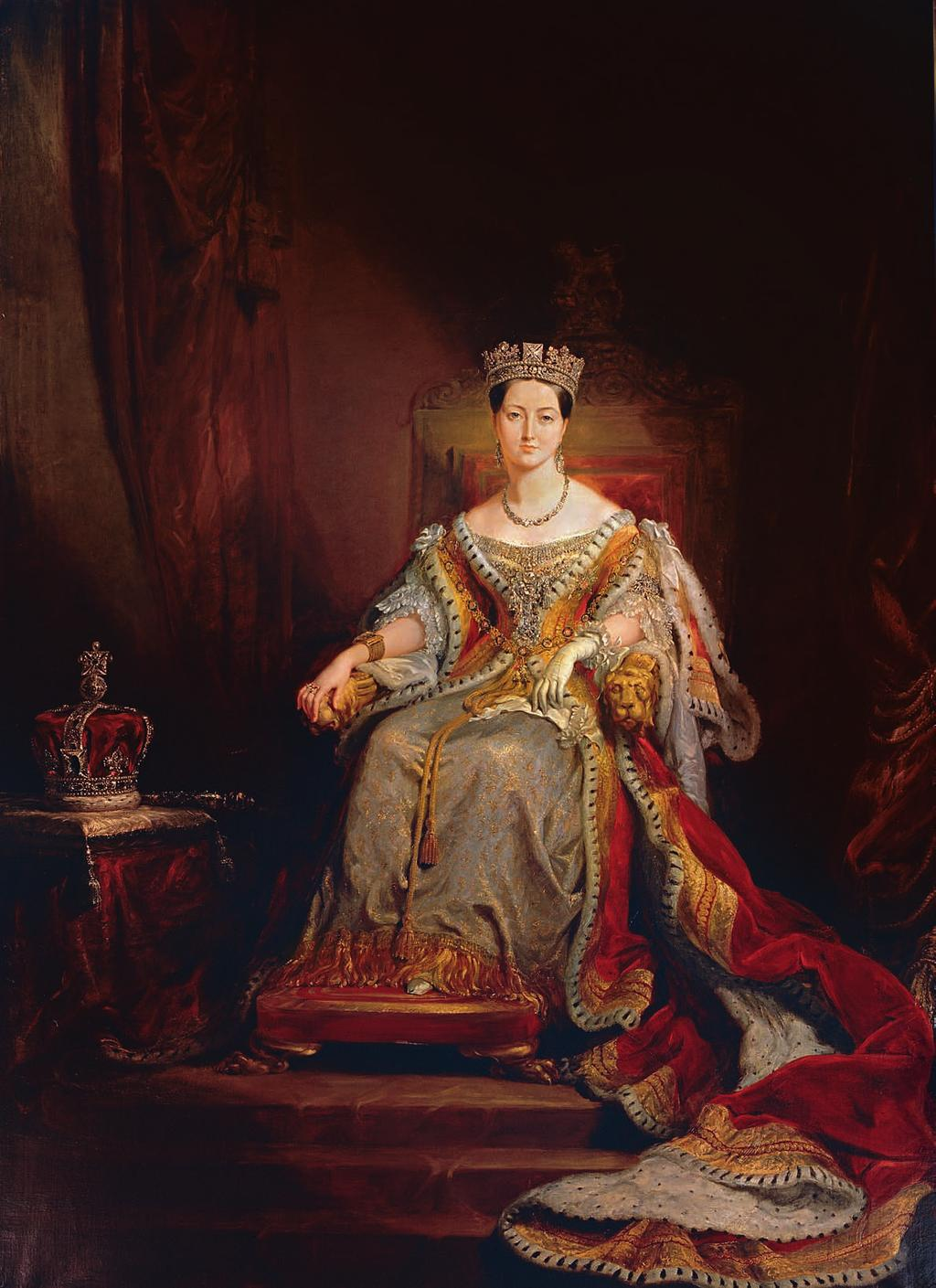
Queen Victoria Enthroned in the House of Lords by George Hayter, 1838

Keats Listening to a Nightingale on Hampstead Heath by Joseph Severn, 1845

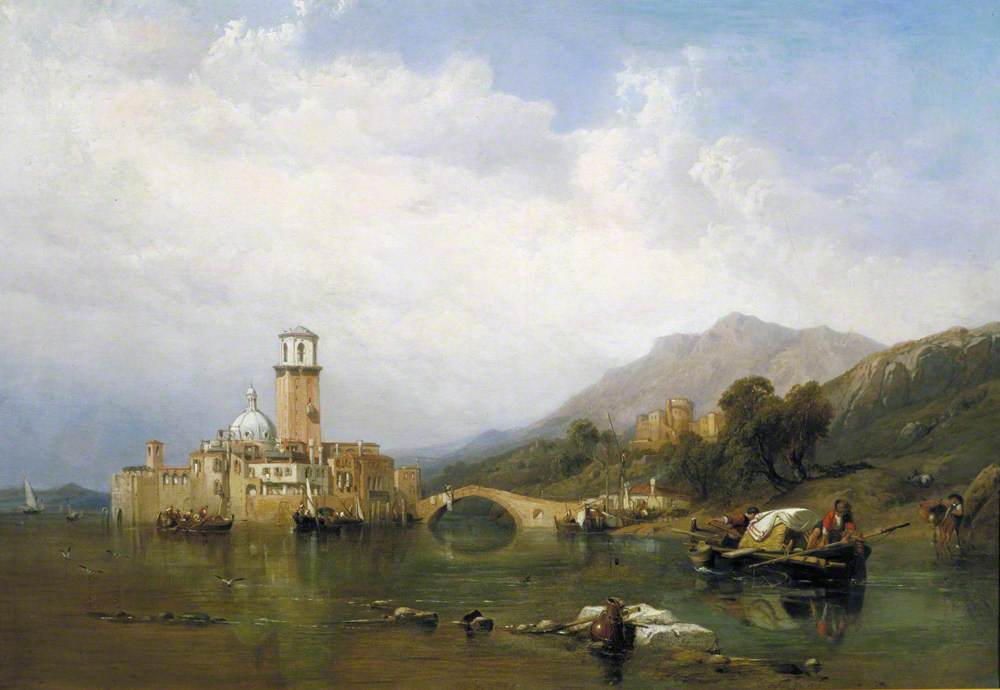
In the Gulf of Venice by Clarkson Stanfield, 1848

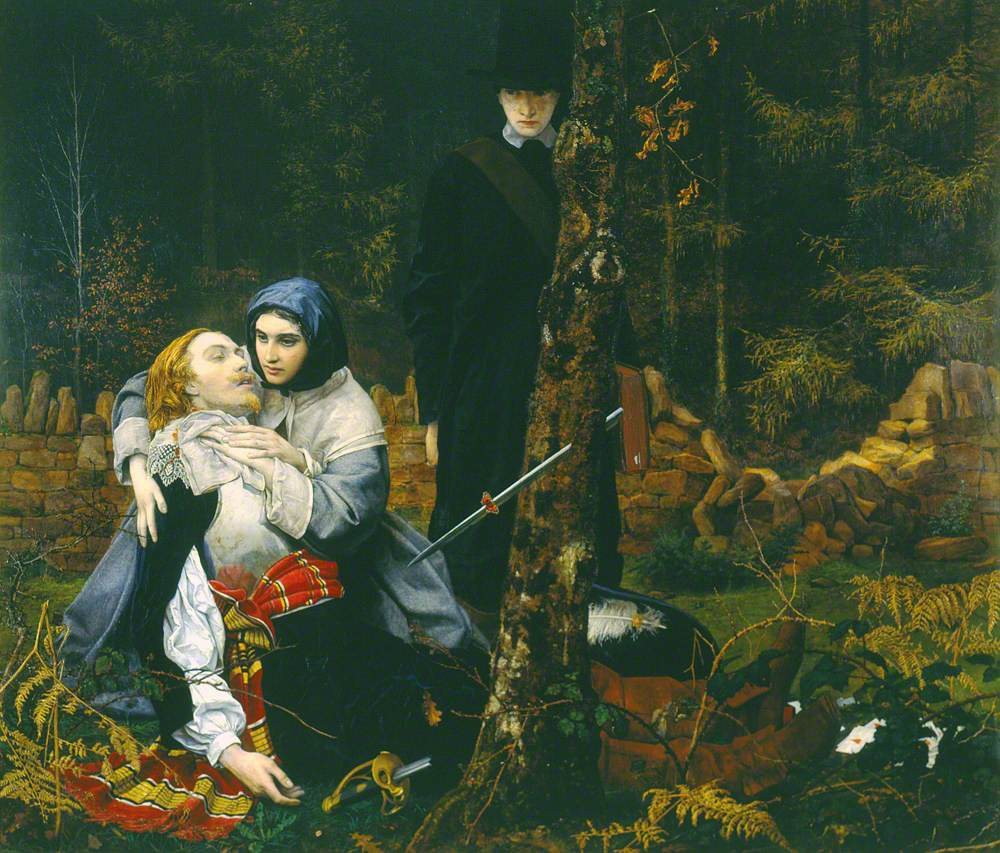
The Wounded Cavalier by William Shakespeare Burton

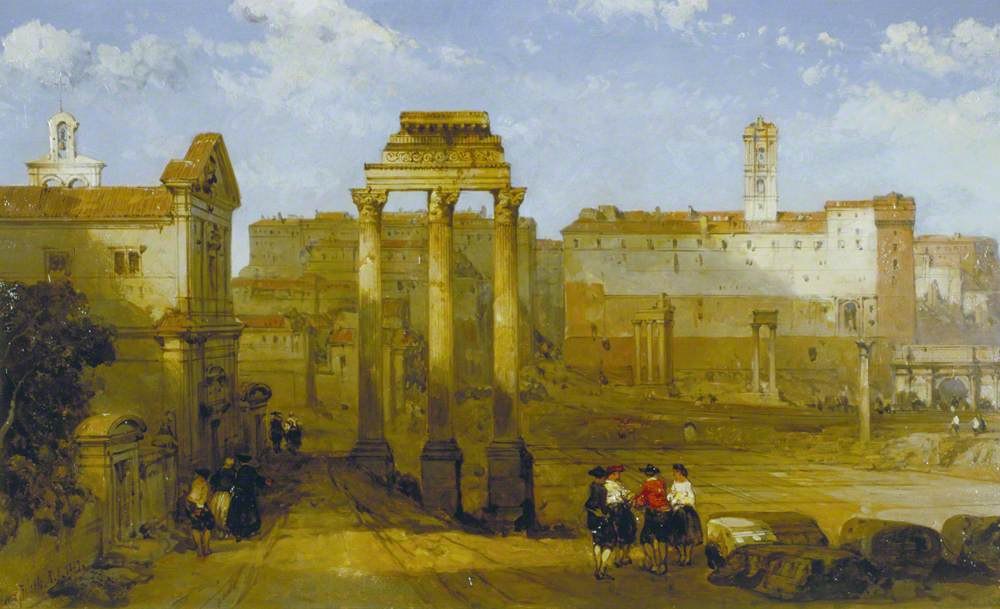
The Forum, Rome, 1859

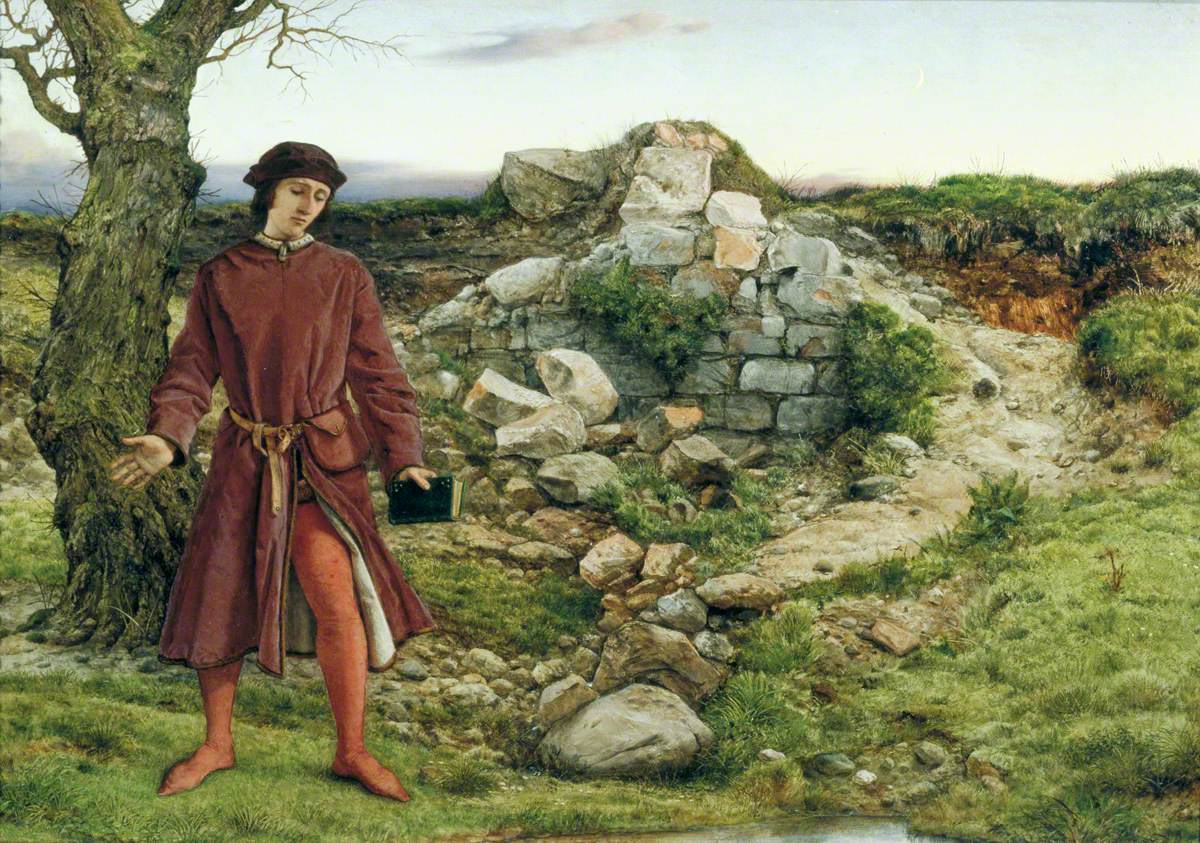
Henry VI at Towton by William Dyce, 1860

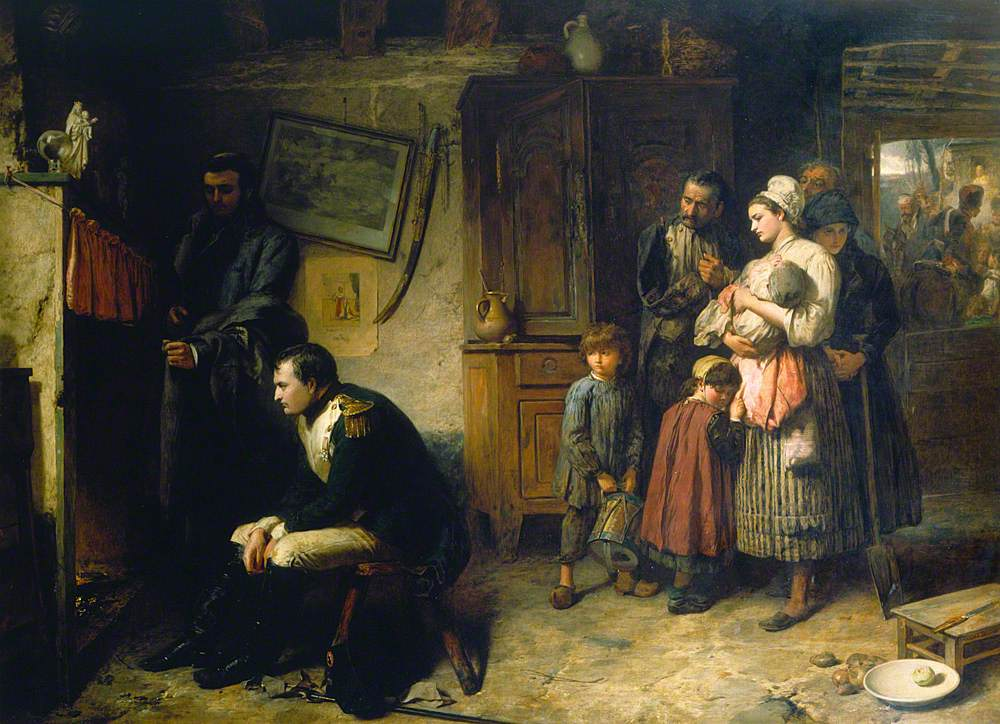
On the Road from Waterloo to Paris by Marcus Stone, 1863

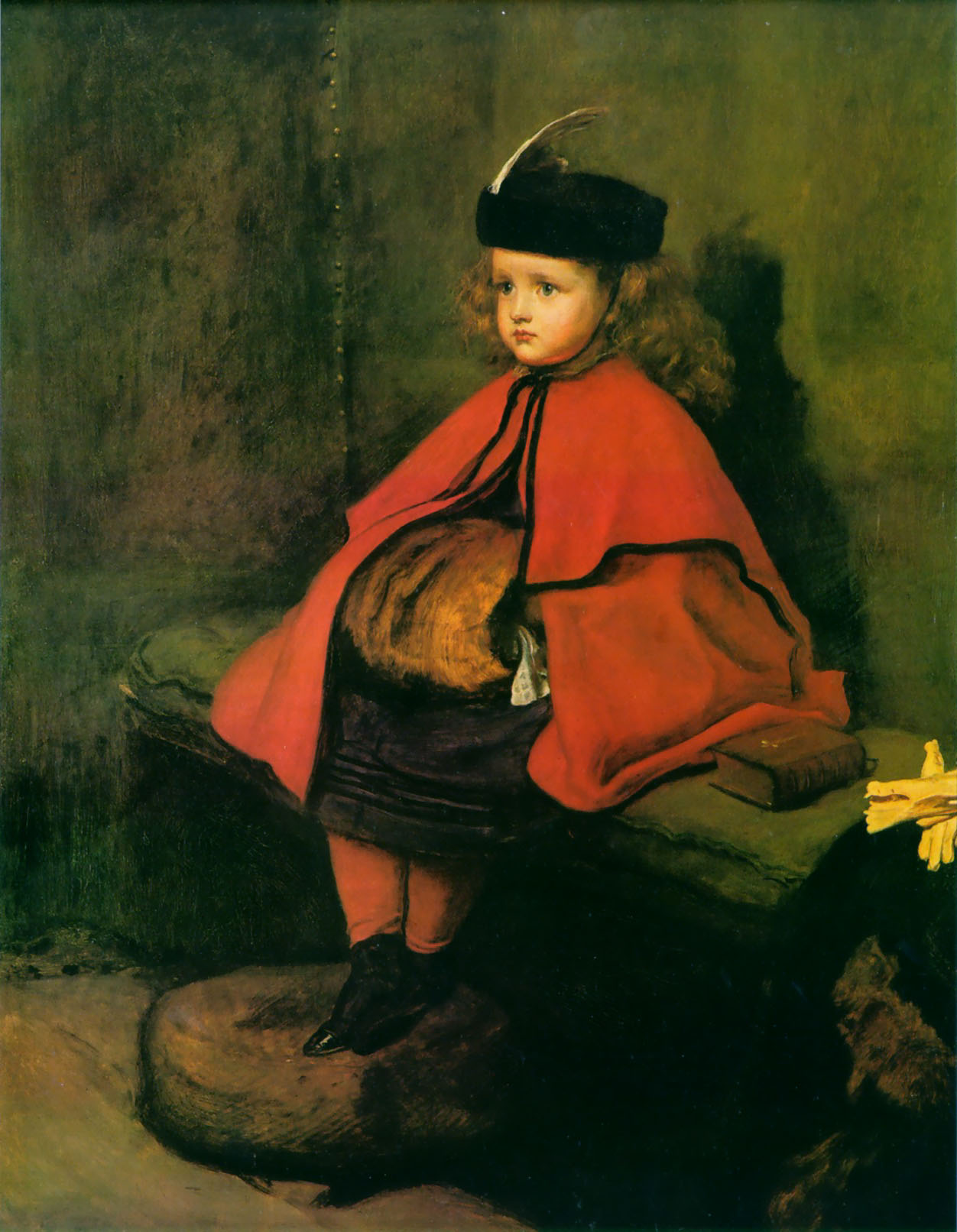
My First Sermon by John Everett Millais, 1863

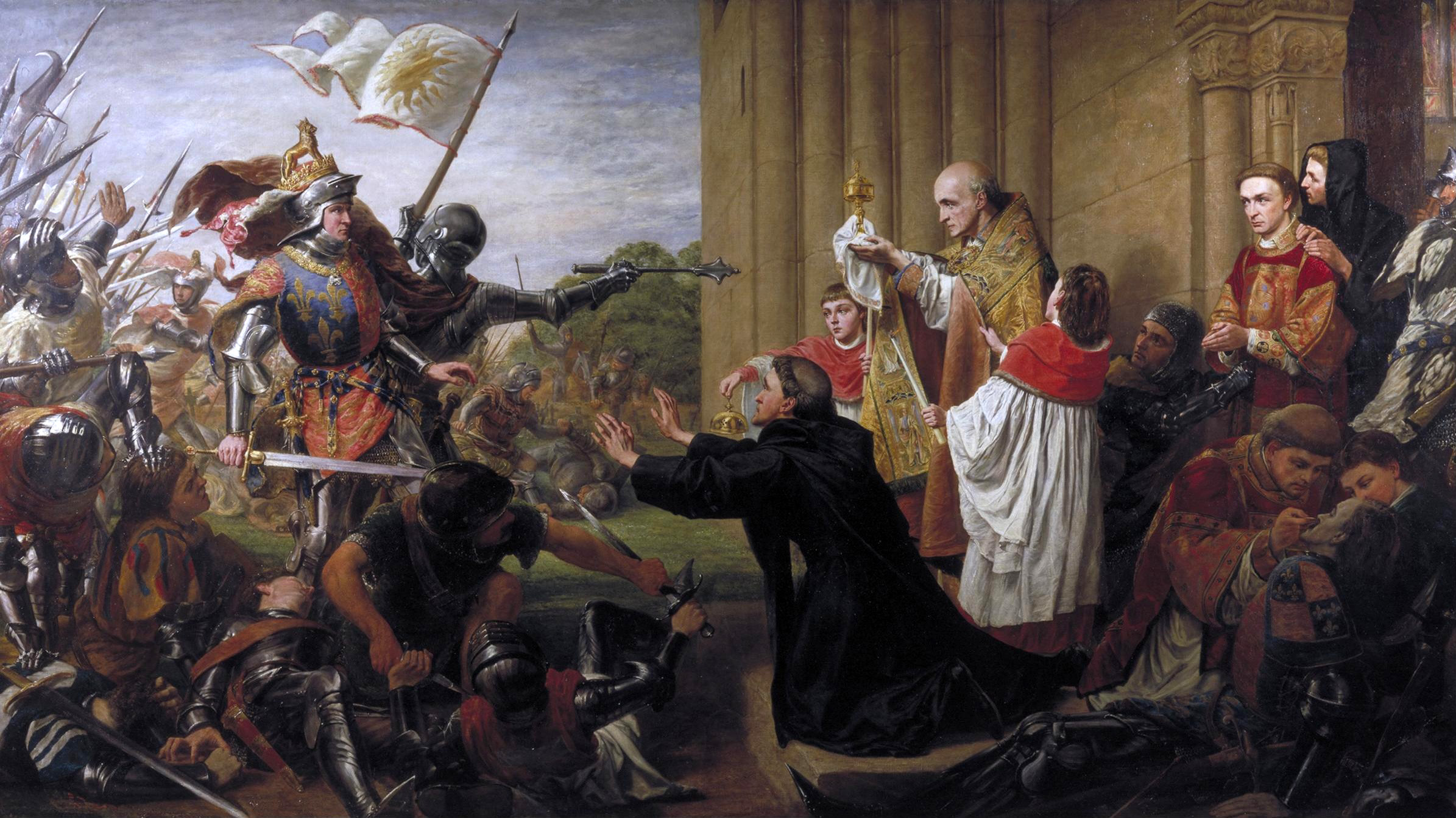
Sanctuary by Richard Burchett, 1867

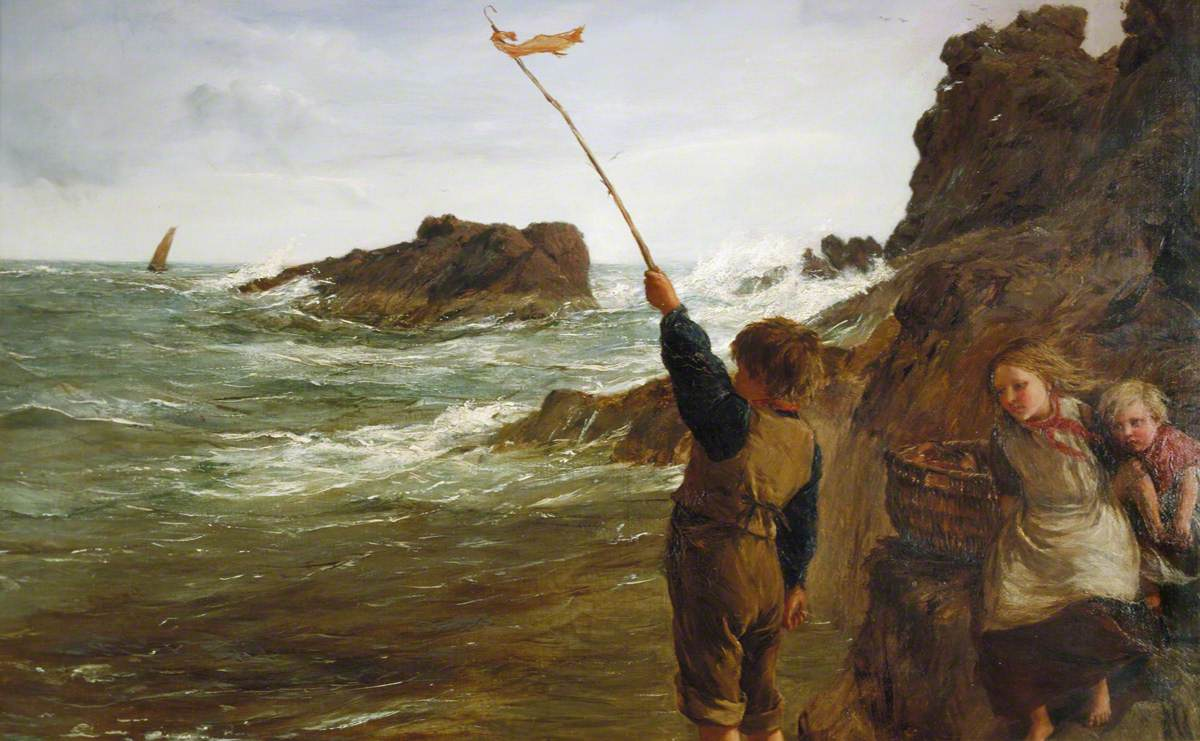
Caught by the Tide by James Clarke Hook, 1869

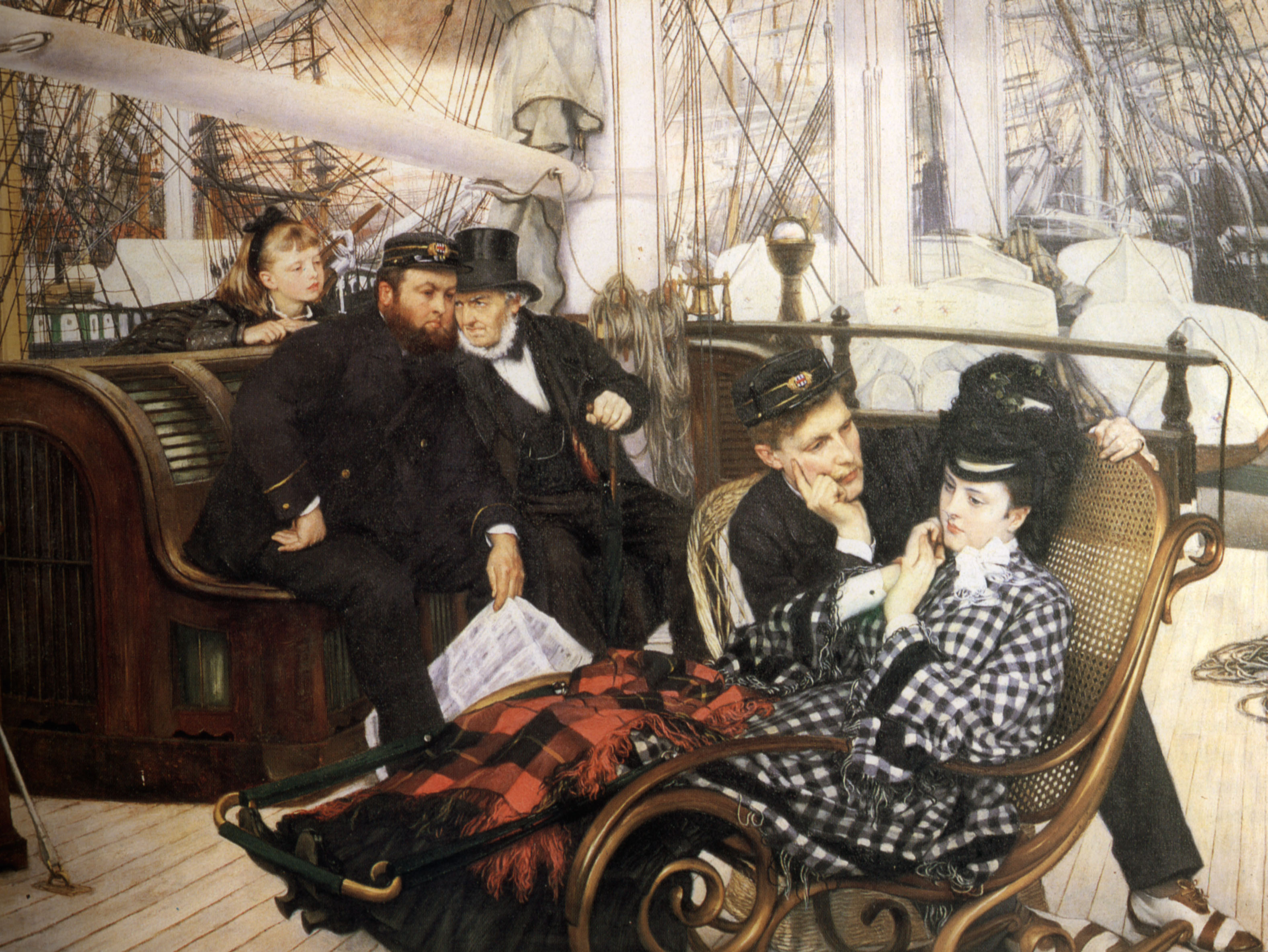
The Last Evening by James Tissot, 1873

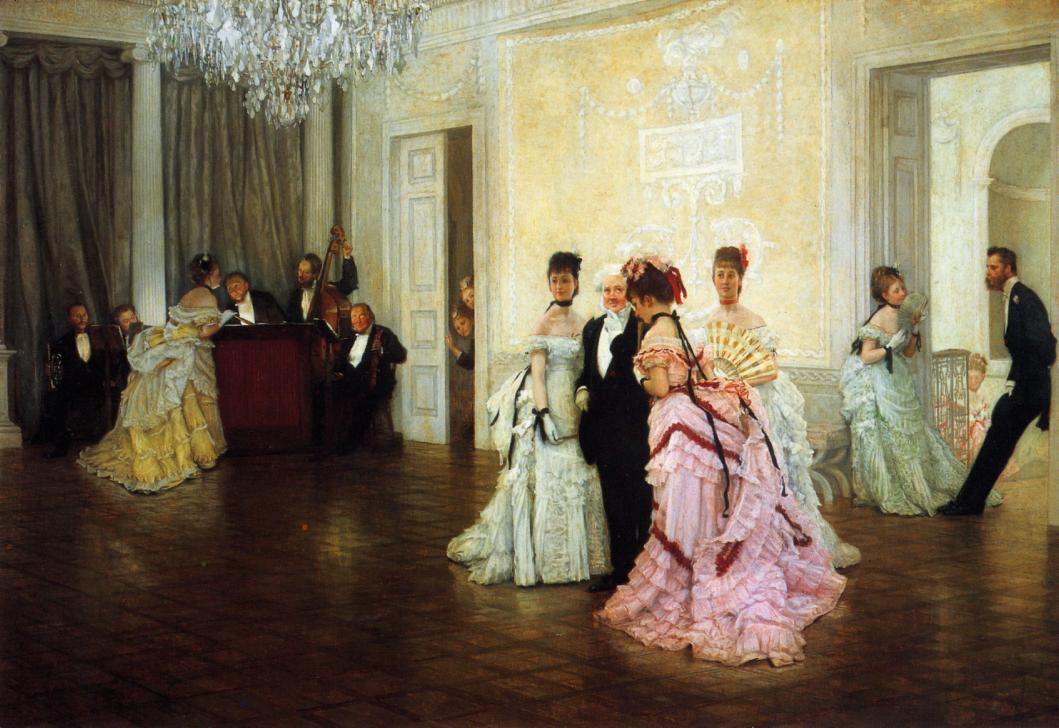
Too Early by James Tissot, 1873

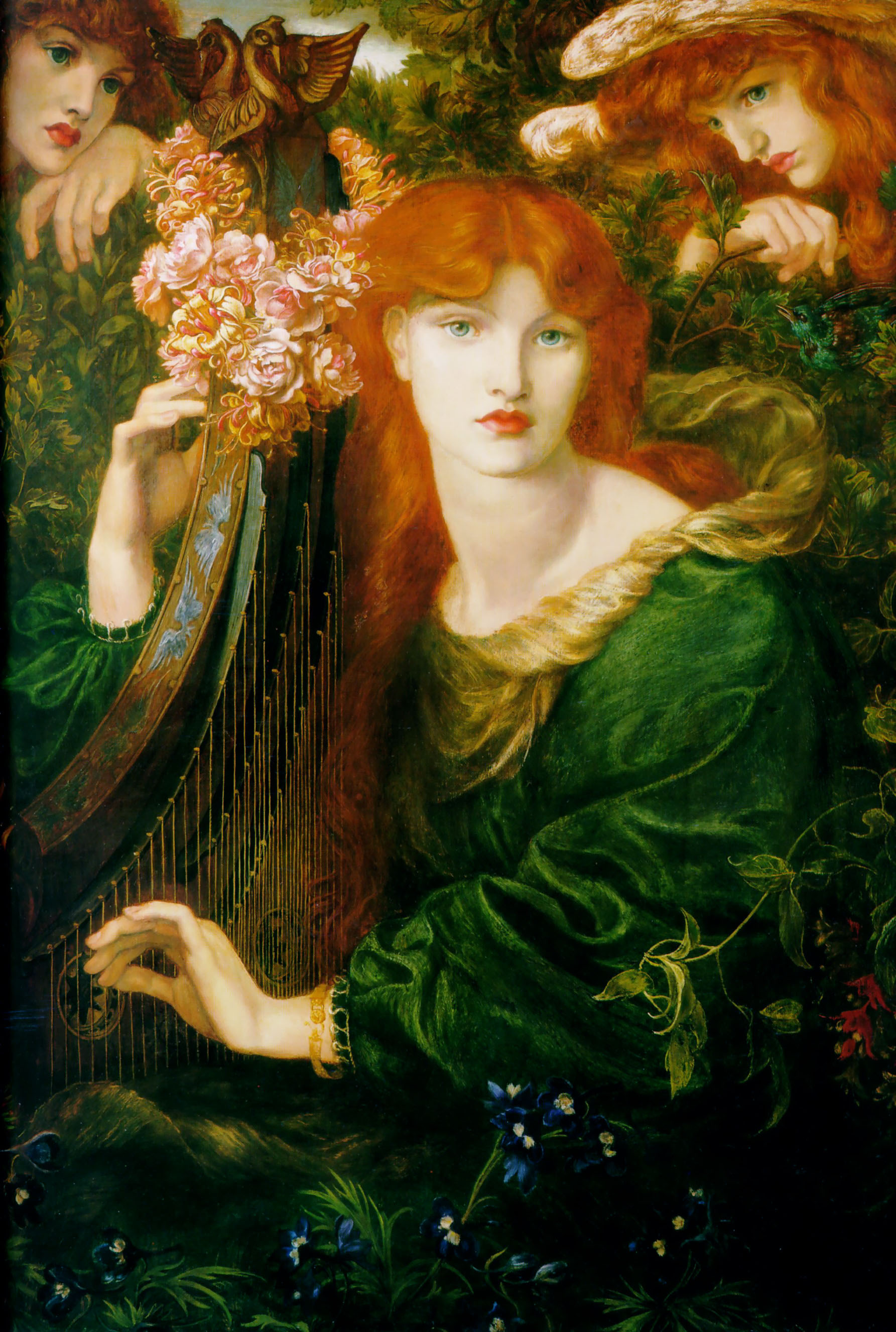
La Ghirlandata by Dante Gabriel Rossetti, 1873

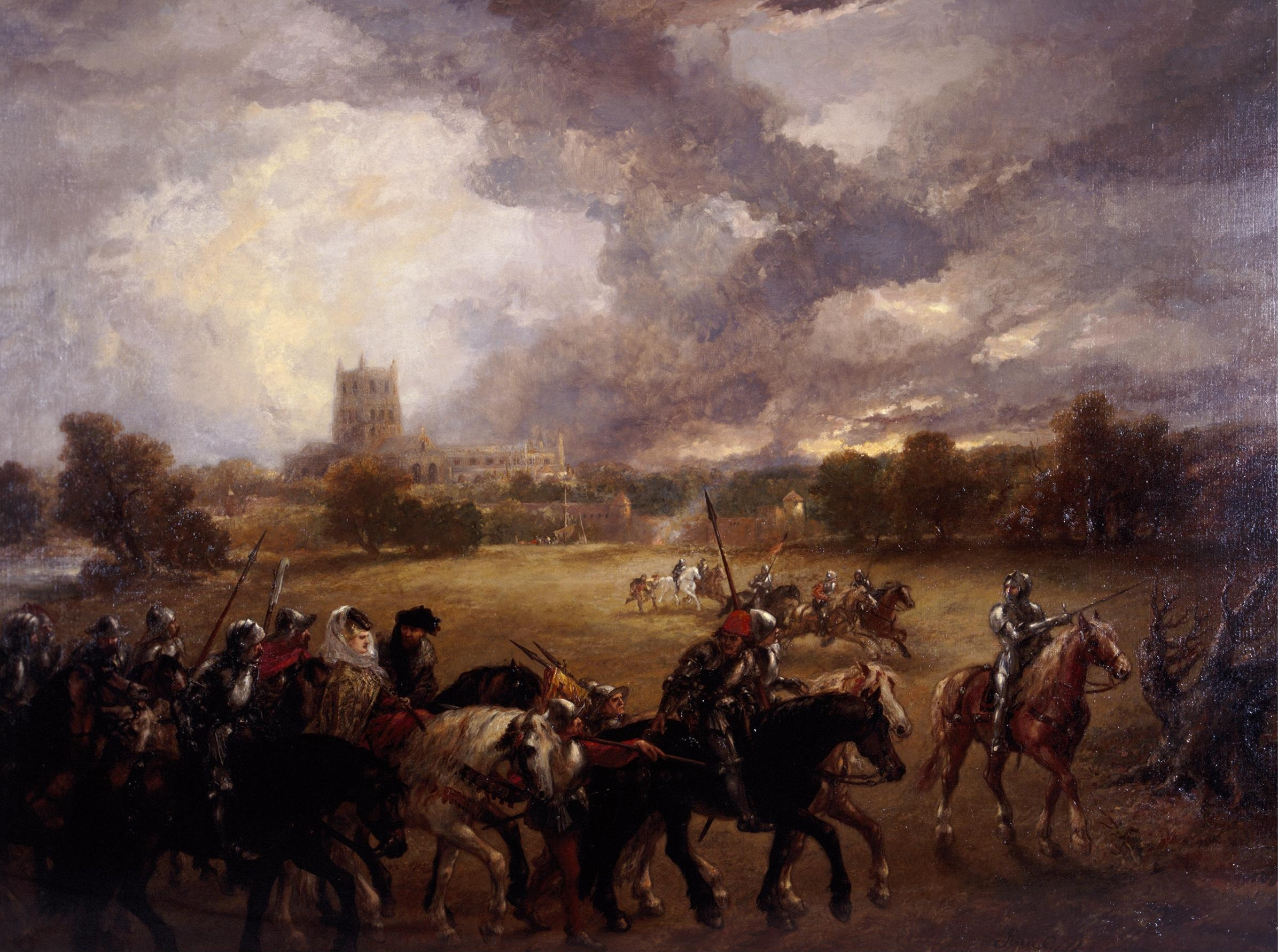
Margaret of Anjou Being Taken Prisoner After the Battle of Tewkesbury by John Gilbert, 1875

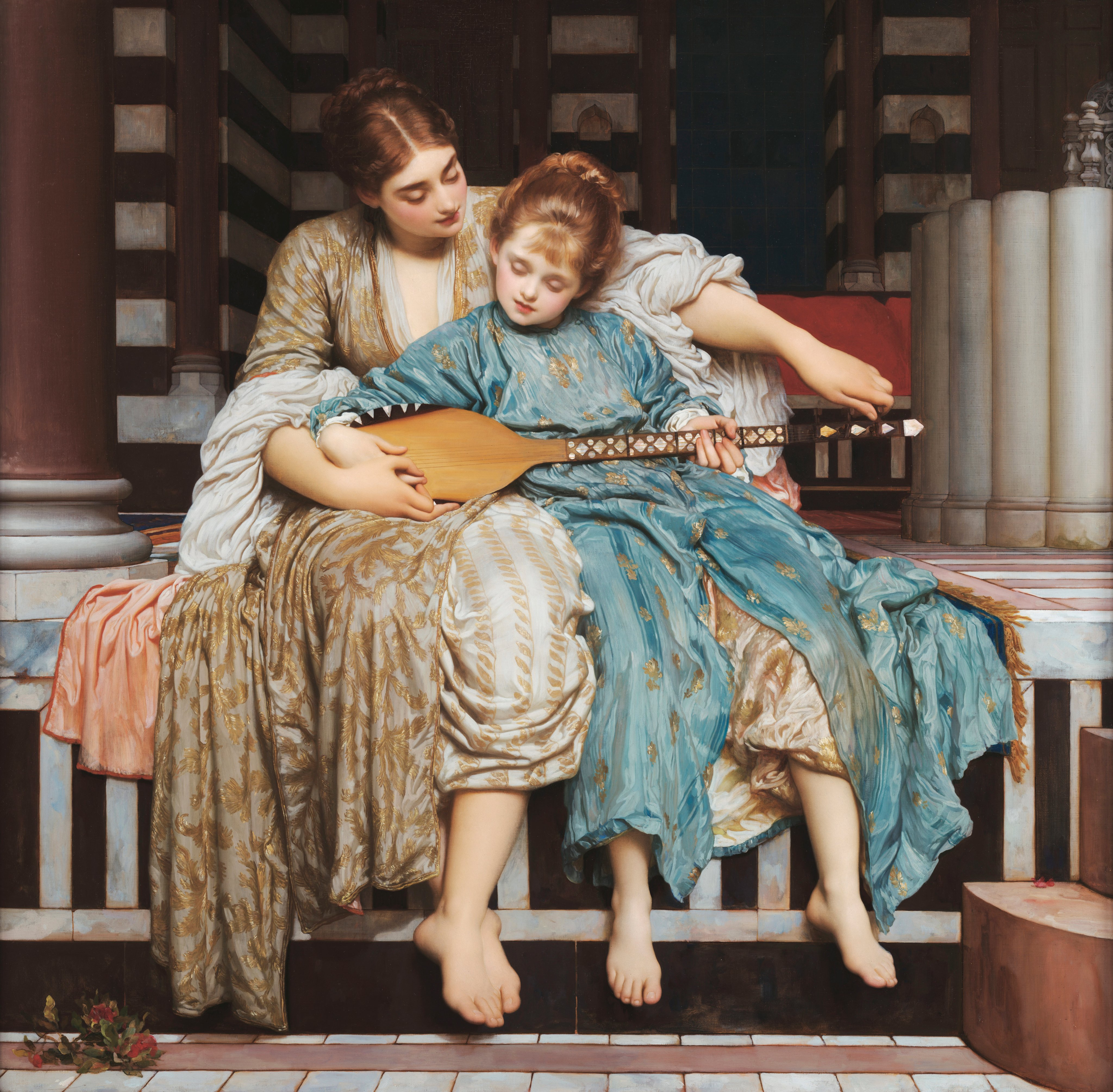
The Music Lesson by Frederic Leighton, 1877

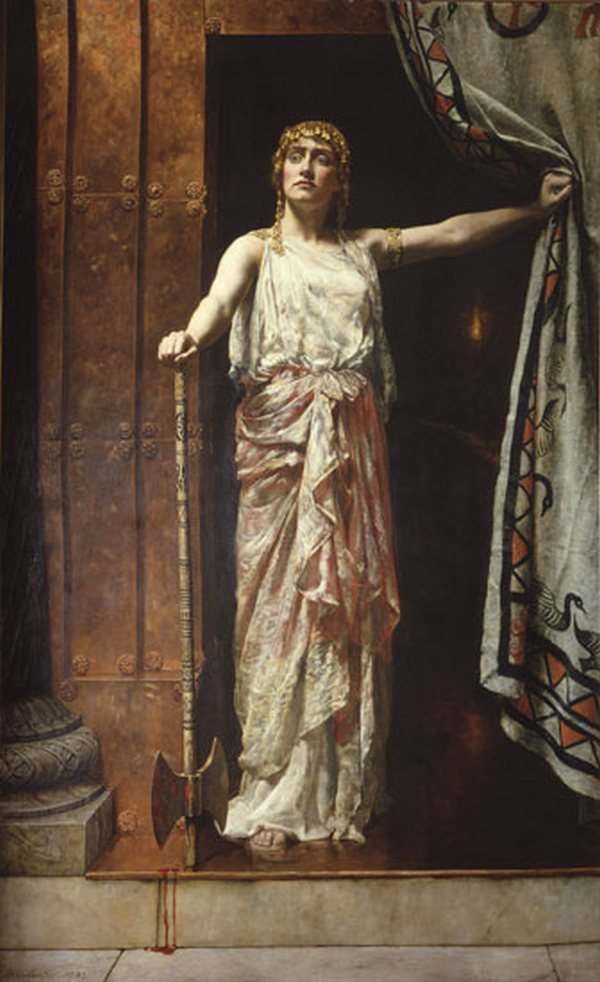
Clytemnestra by John Collier, 1882

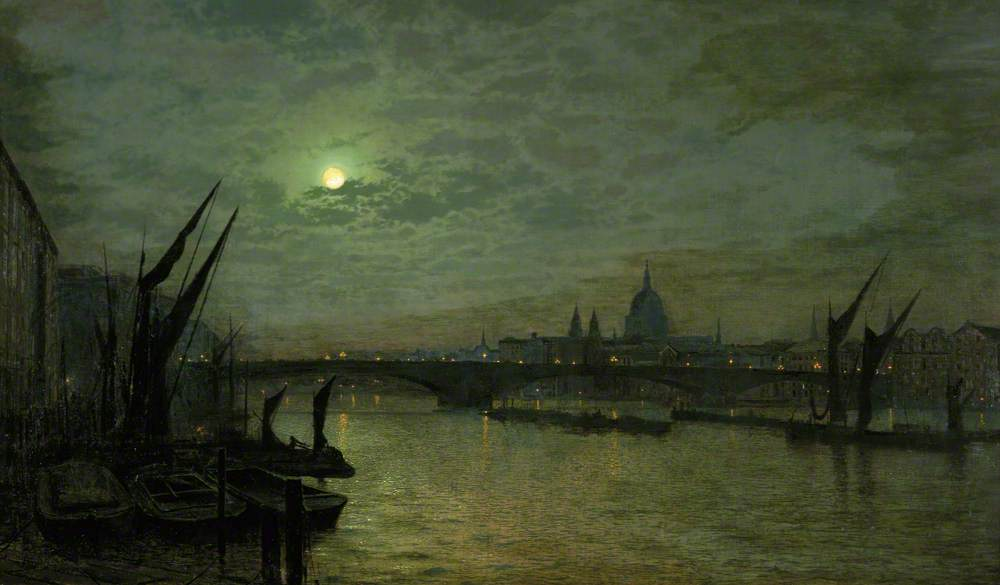
The Thames by Moonlight with Southwark Bridge by John Atkinson Grimshaw, 1884

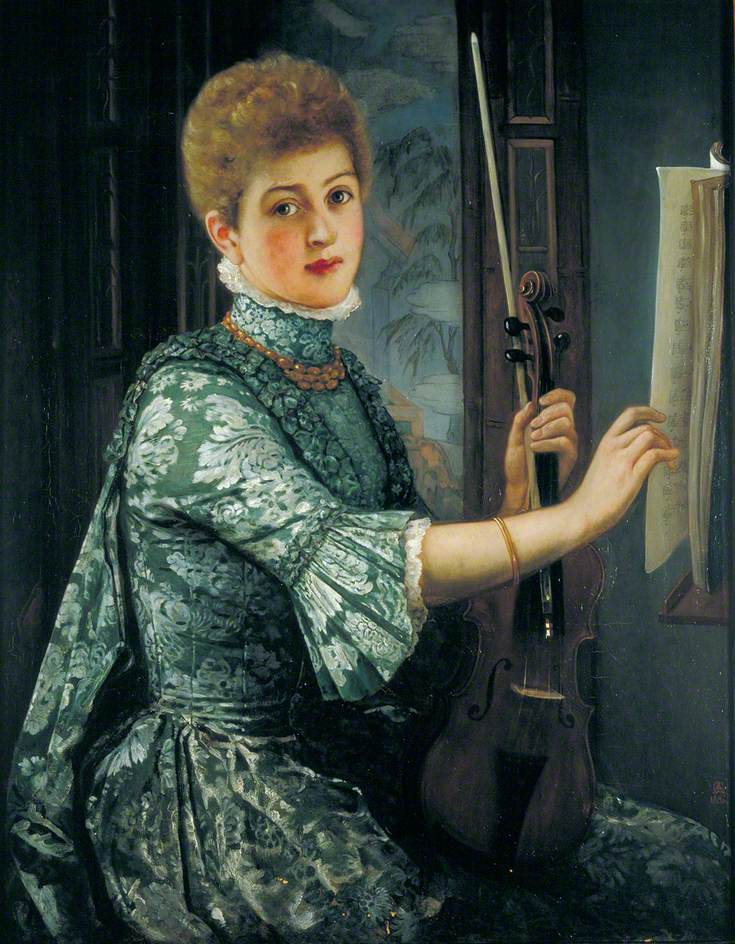
The Violinist by George Adolphus Storey, 1886

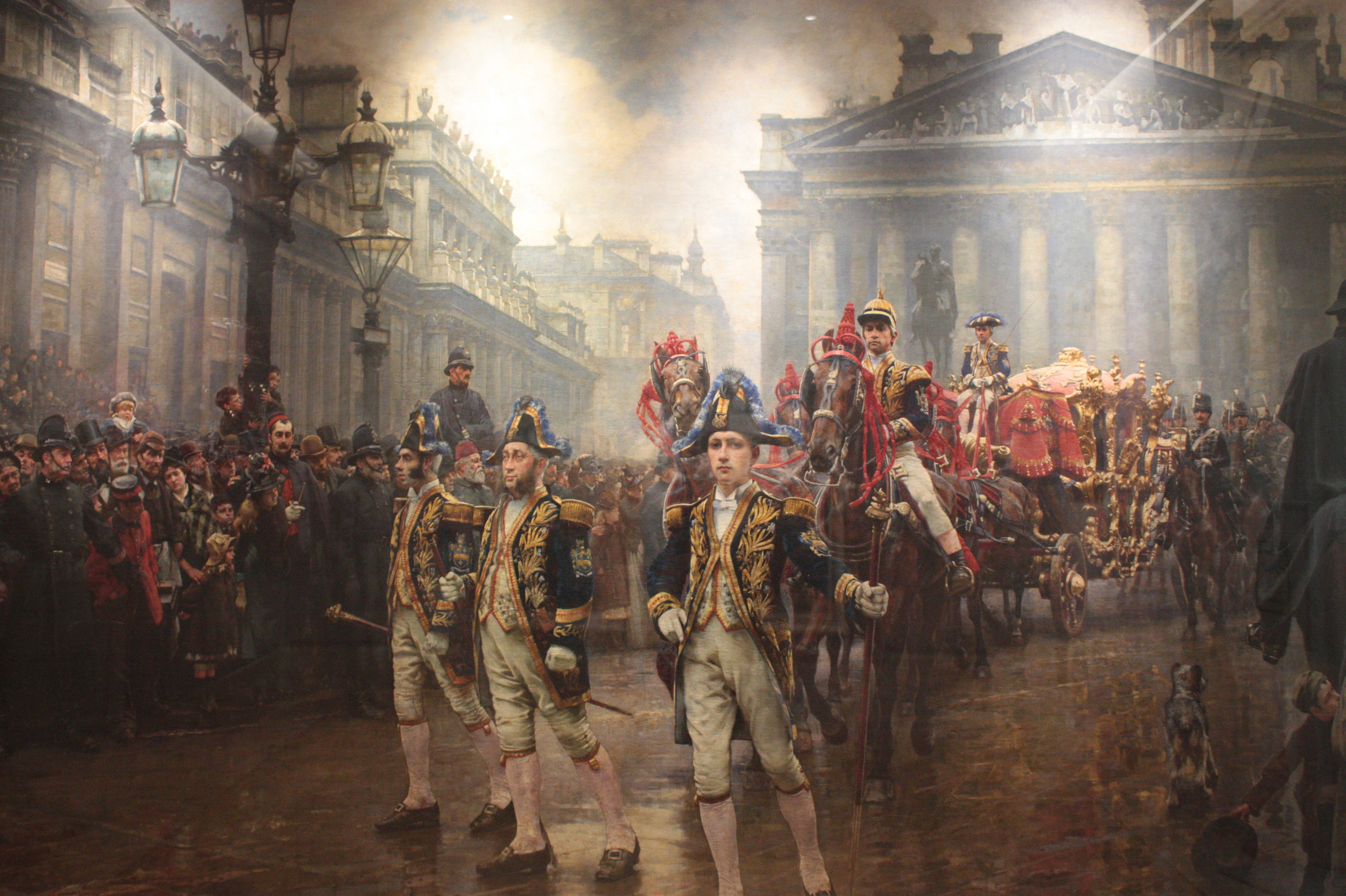
The Ninth of November, 1888 by William Logsdail, 1890

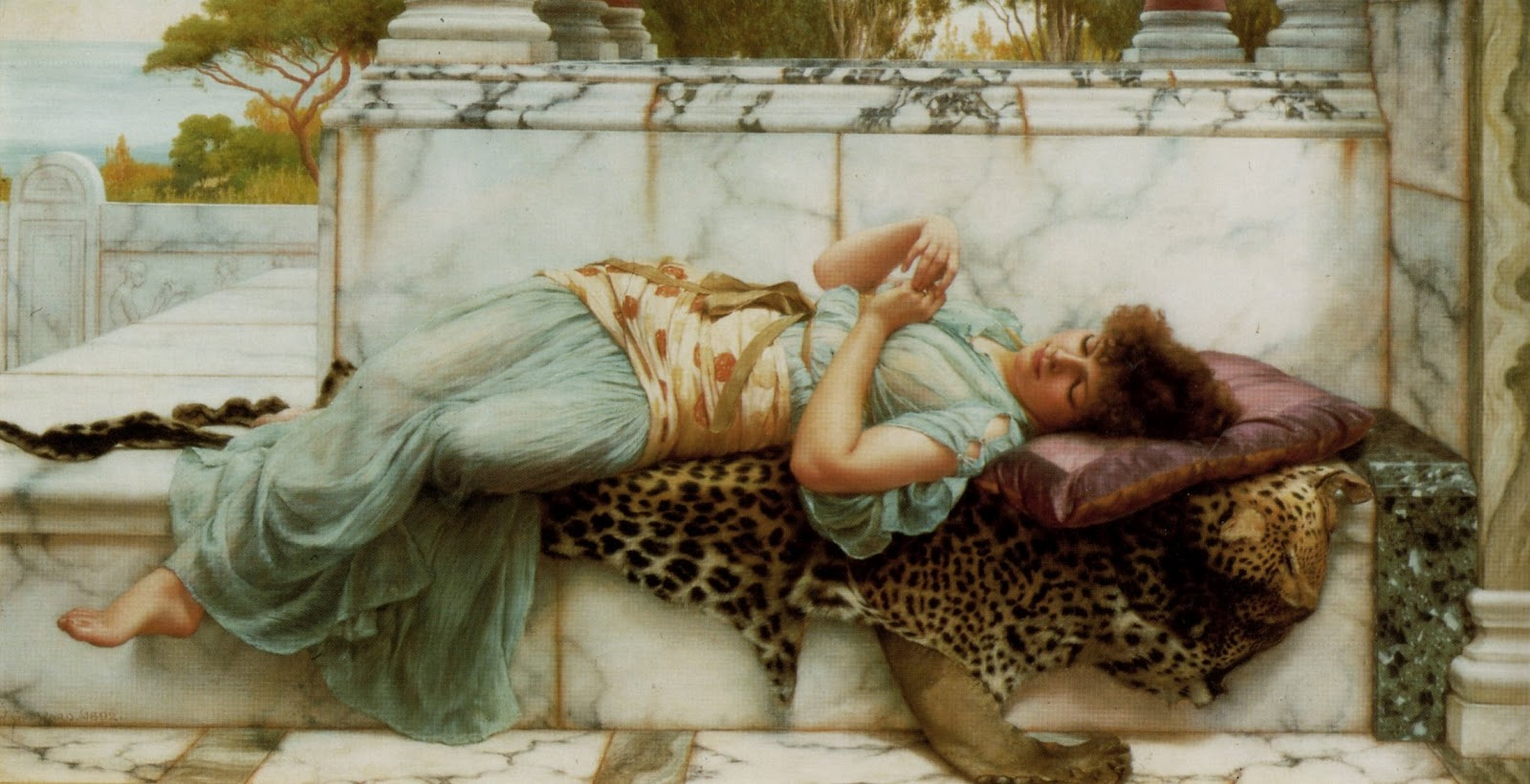
The Betrothed by John William Godward, 1892

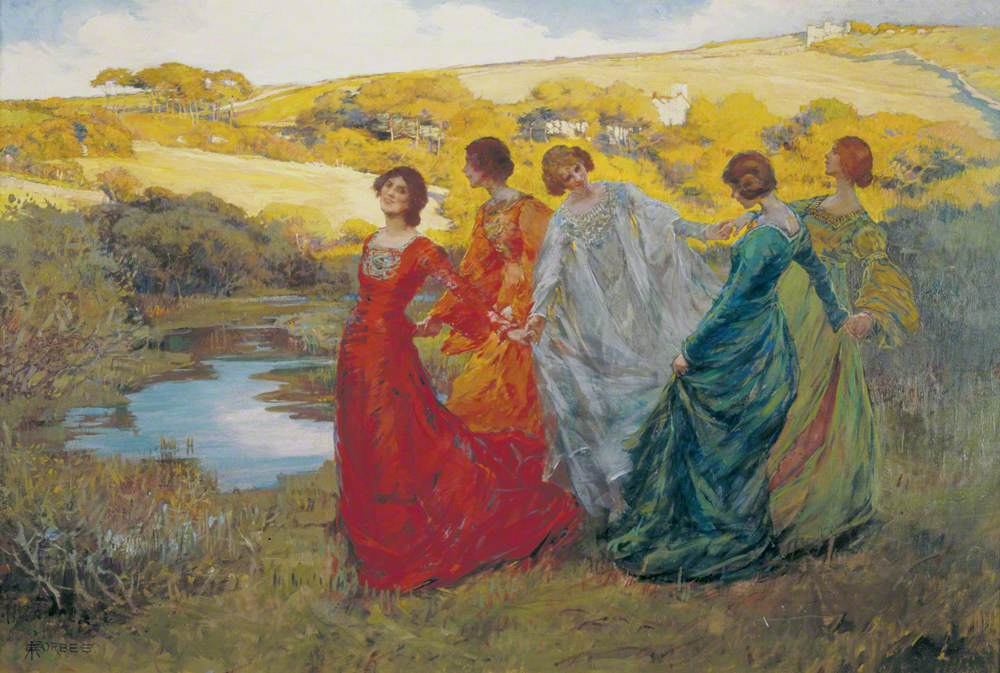
On a Fine Day by Elizabeth Forbes, 1903

== See also ==
- Alfred Temple, first director of the original gallery
- Statue of Margaret Thatcher (London Guildhall)
