= Portrait of John Boydell =

Painting by William Beechey

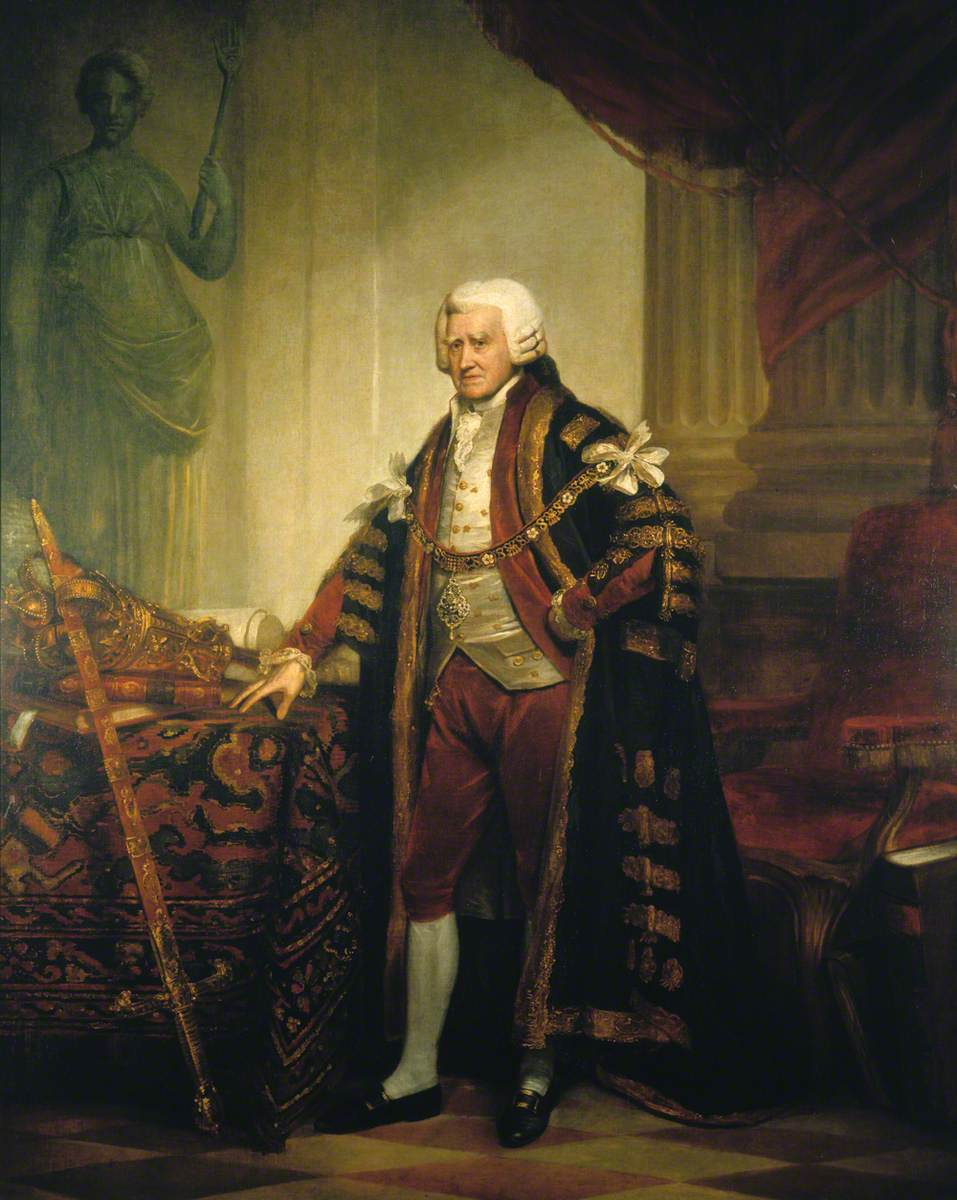
- Artist: William Beechey
- Year: 1801
- Type: Oil on canvas, portrait painting
- Dimensions: 295 cm × 236 cm (116 in × 93 in)
- Location: Guildhall Art Gallery, London

Portrait of John Boydell is an 1801 portrait painting by the British artist William Beechey. It features a full-length depiction of the British publisher and alderman John Boydell. Boydell was particularly known for his commercial promotion of British art and his establishment of the Boydell Shakespeare Gallery. The large-scale painting was commissioned from Beechey by the City of London to commemorate his life and reflects his term as Lord Mayor of London in 1790. He is shown in his robes of office.

The original painting is now in the collection of the Guildhall Art Gallery. A replica of the original by an unknown artist, possibly Thomas Frank Heaphy, is now in the National Portrait Gallery.

== Bibliography ==
- Bruntjen, Sven H. A. John Boydell, 1719-1804: A Study of Art Patronage and Publishing in Georgian London. Garland Publishing, 1975.
- Ingamells, John. National Portrait Gallery Mid-Georgian Portraits, 1760–1790. National Portrait Gallery, 2004.
