= Sanctuary (painting) =

1867 painting by Richard Burchett

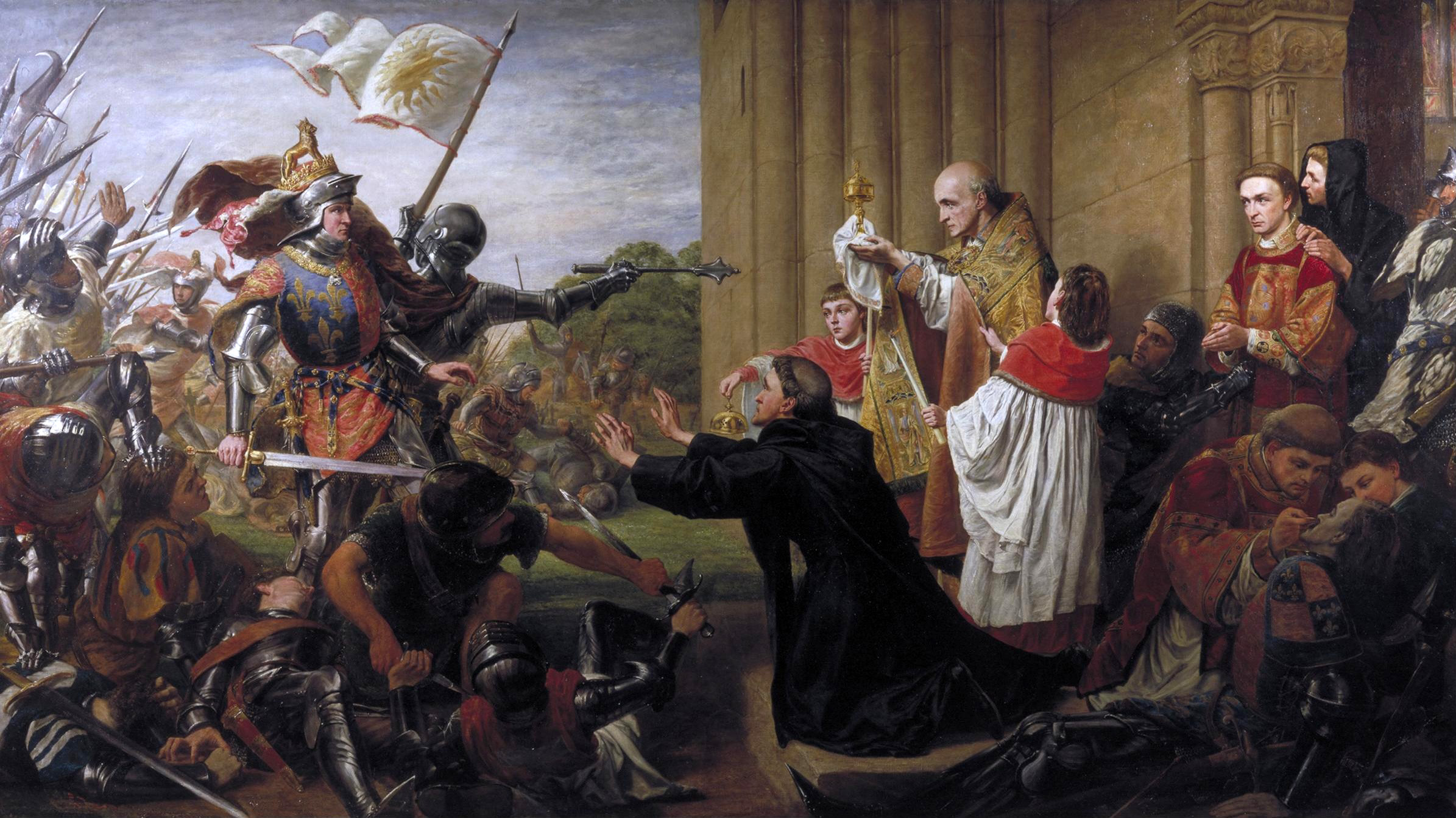
- Artist: Richard Burchett
- Year: 1867
- Type: History painting
- Medium: Oil on canvas
- Dimensions: 150 cm × 270 cm (61 in × 108 in)
- Location: Guildhall Art Gallery; London

Sanctuary or Edward IV and Lancastrian Fugitives at Tewkesbury Abbey is an 1867 history painting by the British artist Richard Burchett depicting a scene from the War of the Roses. It portrays the aftermath of the Battle of Tewkesbury in 1471 when fugitives of the defeated Lancastrians attempted to seek safety in Tewkesbury Abbey from their Yorkist enemies. The Yorkist king Edward IV is shown with his followers checked at the door by priests upholding the tradition of sanctuary on church property.

Burchett produced a number of works in the style of the Pre-Raphaelite Brotherhood. It was exhibited at the Royal Academy's Summer Exhibition of 1867. Today it is in the collection of the Guildhall Art Gallery in the City of London, having been acquired in 1895.

== Bibliography ==
- Kendall, Paul. Wars of the Roses: The People, Places and Battlefields of the Yorkists and Lancastrians. Frontline Books, 2023.
- Knight, Vivien. The Works of Art of the Corporation of London: A Catalogue of Paintings, Watercolours, Drawings, Prints and Sculpture. Woodhead-Faulkner, 1986.
- Santiuste, David. Edward IV and the Wars of the Roses. Grub Street Publishers, 2010.
- Yeldham, Charlotte. Art and Protest: The Role of Art during the Campaign which led to the New Forest Act (1877). Walter de Gruyter, 2023.
