= High society =

People with the highest levels of wealth and social status

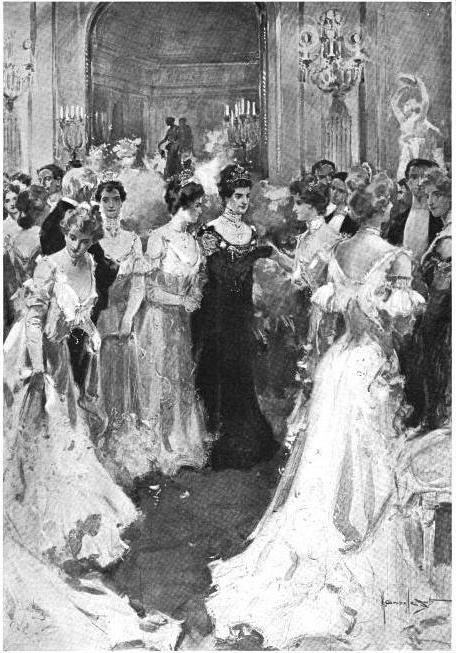
Caroline Astor and her guests, drawing, 1902

High society, sometimes simply Society, is the behavior and lifestyle of people with the highest levels of wealth, power, fame and social status. It includes their related affiliations, social events and practices. Upscale social clubs were open to men based on assessments of their ranking and role within high society. In American high society, the Social Register was traditionally a key resource for identifying qualified members. For a global perspective, see upper class. The quality of housing, clothing, servants and dining were visible marks of membership.

== History ==
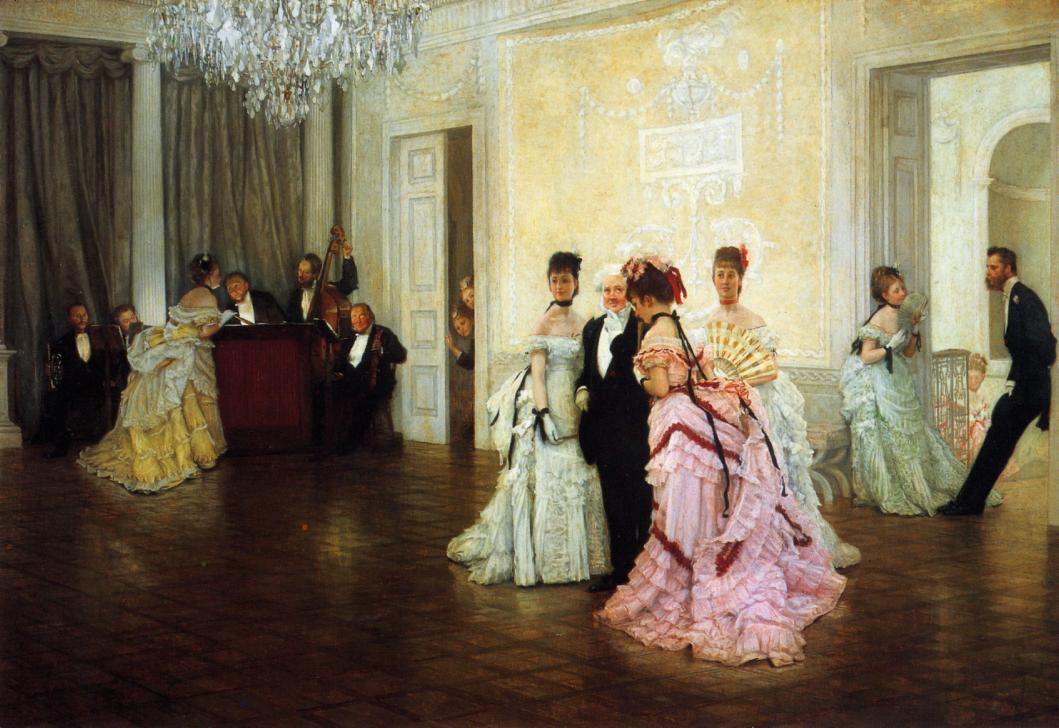
Too Early by James Tissot, 1873

=== 19th century ===
The term became common in the late 19th century, especially when the newly rich arrived in key cities such as New York City, Boston, and Newport, Rhode Island, built great mansions and sponsored highly publicized parties. The media lavished attention on them, especially when newspapers devoted whole sections to weddings, funerals, parties and other events sponsored by the local high society. In major cities, a Social Register was published that listed the names and addresses of people who properly belonged. Informal identifiers appeared, such as the "upper tens" in mid-19th century New York City, or "the 400," Ward McAllister's late 19th-century term for the number of people that Caroline Schermerhorn Astor's ballroom could supposedly accommodate, although the actual number was 273.

Debutantes are young female members of high society being officially presented for the first time, at debutante balls or cotillions. An example of a high society debutante ball is the prestigious International Debutante Ball at the Waldorf Astoria Hotel in New York City.

Gold and silver mining, in the mid 19th century brought enormous wealth overnight to certain small towns such as Central City, Colorado and Leadville, Colorado. The new rich typically build a lavish opera house in the mining town, but then moved to a major city, especially Denver or San Francisco, where their wealth could be more suitably displayed and enjoyed. Given conventional gender roles that were dominant in society, the men attended to business affairs, while women generally took charge of comings and goings and doings in high society.

Starting with the Stuyvesant luxury apartment house that opened in 1869, and The Dakota in 1884, affluent New Yorkers discovered the advantages of apartment living, where a full-time staff handled the upkeep and maintenance, as well as security.

In most French cities the very rich, often holding an old aristocratic title, maintained an elaborate high society well into the 20th century. Hiring ten to twenty servants demonstrated the taste for conspicuous consumption. The richest households in Paris typically employed 30 servants. After 1945 the supply of servants dried up and there was a move to smaller inner city apartments in elite neighborhoods.

=== 20th century ===
In the 20th century, the London Social Season continued to be held annually with debutantes being presented to court at the Queen Charlotte's Ball until 1958. These debutantes (usually aged 17-21) were required to be sponsored by former debutantes, and thus tended to be members of high society. The Season includes events such as the Royal Ascot, Wimbledon, operas and flower shows.

In the 1910s, the group known as The Coterie (or "Corrupt Coterie") emerged in high society. Its members included Lady Diana Manners, then considered a famous beauty in England and the daughter of a Duke and Duchess; Duff Cooper, who became a Conservative politician and a diplomat; Raymond Asquith, son of the Prime Minister H. H. Asquith and a famed barrister; Maurice Baring; Patrick Shaw-Stewart, a managing director of Barings Bank and war poet; Julian & Billy Grenfell, Nancy Cunard and her friend Iris Tree. In the 1920s ("The Roaring Twenties"), the infamous group known as The Bright Young Things emerged, and included the Mitford Sisters, members of the Guinness family, members of the Tennant family, Queen Elizabeth The Queen Mother, Princess Nina of Russia, the Curzon sisters, members of the Spencer-Churchill family, John Betjeman, Cecil Beaton, and various other aristocrats and royals. The group was known for their infamous treasure hunts around London.

The 20th century saw some of the most lavish high society parties, including Truman Capote's Black and White Ball in 1966, a masquerade attended by all of New York's elite. Another was Elizabeth Taylor's 40th birthday bash in 1972, whilst she was married to Richard Burton. Princess Gloria von Thurn and Taxis (the 80s it-girl known as "Princess TNT" and the "punk princess"), threw the ultimate 60th birthday party for her husband (who was the grandson of the pretender to the throne of Portugal) in 1986, attended by various royals and aristocrats.

In 1971, Iran's Shah Mohammed Reza Pahlavi threw the most expensive party ever thrown to commemorate the Persian Empire's 2500th anniversary. The cost of the party is estimated by some to be in the hundreds of millions. Kings, Queens, Emperors, Empresses, Princes, Princesses, Dukes, Duchess, aristocrats, Presidents, Prime Ministers and all other important people from around the world attended, in one of the biggest gatherings of foreign royalty ever.

=== 21st century ===
High society is less visible in the 21st century—privacy is much more valued, and the very expensive housing is not as conspicuous to ordinary pedestrians as the famous old mansions. There are far fewer servants, but much more attention to security. Remote ski resorts in places like Vail and Aspen are especially popular with high society. However, the rise of social media services such as Instagram and Facebook has given a new outlet to practices of conspicuous consumption that characterize the upper class.

Philanthropy is a high-prestige activity in high society. Sociologist Francie Ostrower states:

The wealthy take philanthropy and adapt it into an entire way of life that serves as a vehicle for the social and cultural life of their class. This is reflected in the widespread popularity of educational and cultural causes among donors.

== Art ==
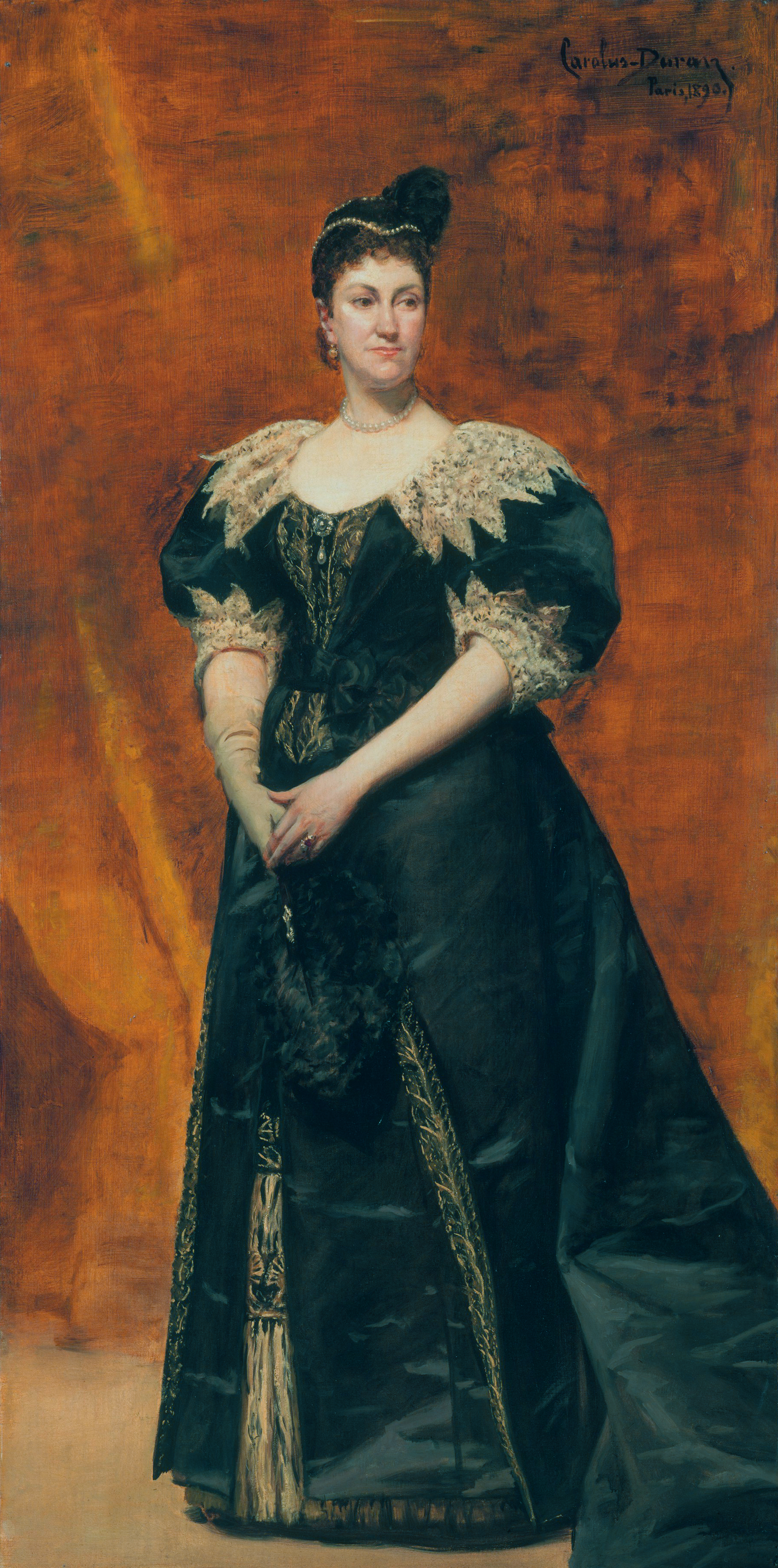
Mrs. William Astor painted by Carolus-Duran in 1890, presented at the 1894 Great Portrait Exhibition

Art in this time was almost exclusively linked to the possession of money. The art of high society focused greatly on absorbing cultures from around the world, and referencing great architecture from the past, and commissioning artists that were from Europe. The culture was to possess knowledge and artifacts from other cultures or at least replicated it very well.

Acquiring rare and valuable items was another way of high society representing its prestige. Art was also a way of representing taste level and someone's ability to commission the right artist or chose the best piece to have installed in their homes.

=== Portraiture ===
Portrait painters were in high demand in London. Meanwhile, the smaller corps of American artists shifted their focus from painting the great landscapes of America to making portraits of great Americans. However art historians generally ignored the society artists such as John Singer Sargent (1856–1925) until the late 20th century.

Portraiture became the most common art in order for people in high society to record and have evidence of their accomplishment and valuable possessions.

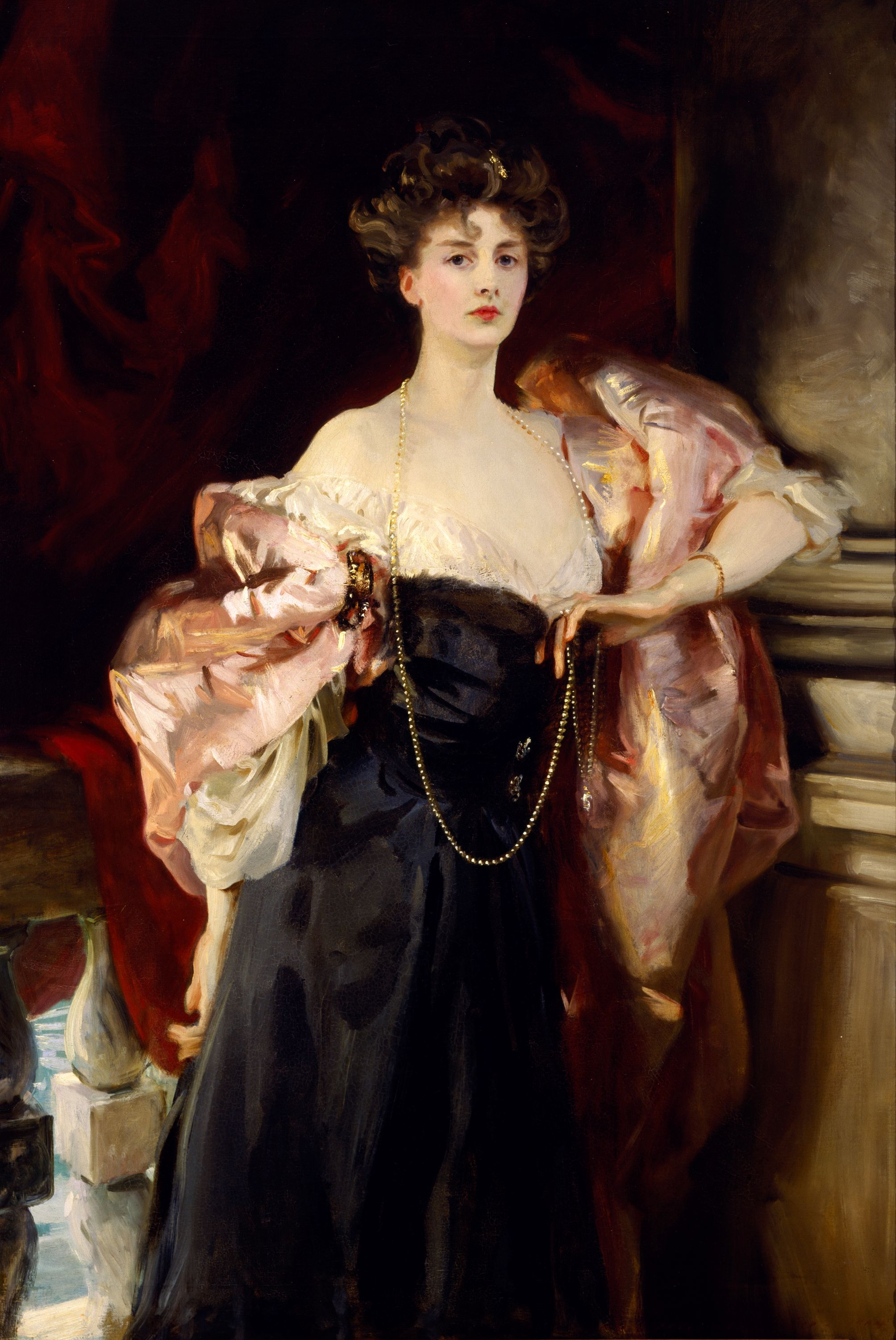
"Portrait of Lady Helen Vincent" by J.S. Sargent, 1904

New York City started its Great Portrait Exhibition, focused on high society. The exhibition became a place for people to see Who's Who in New York City high society and focused more on the names of the people in the portraits rather than the quality of the portraits. The art community changed its focus to portraiture and became a tight-knit circle of patrons (who were, more often than not, also subjects), artists, and critics.

=== Architecture ===
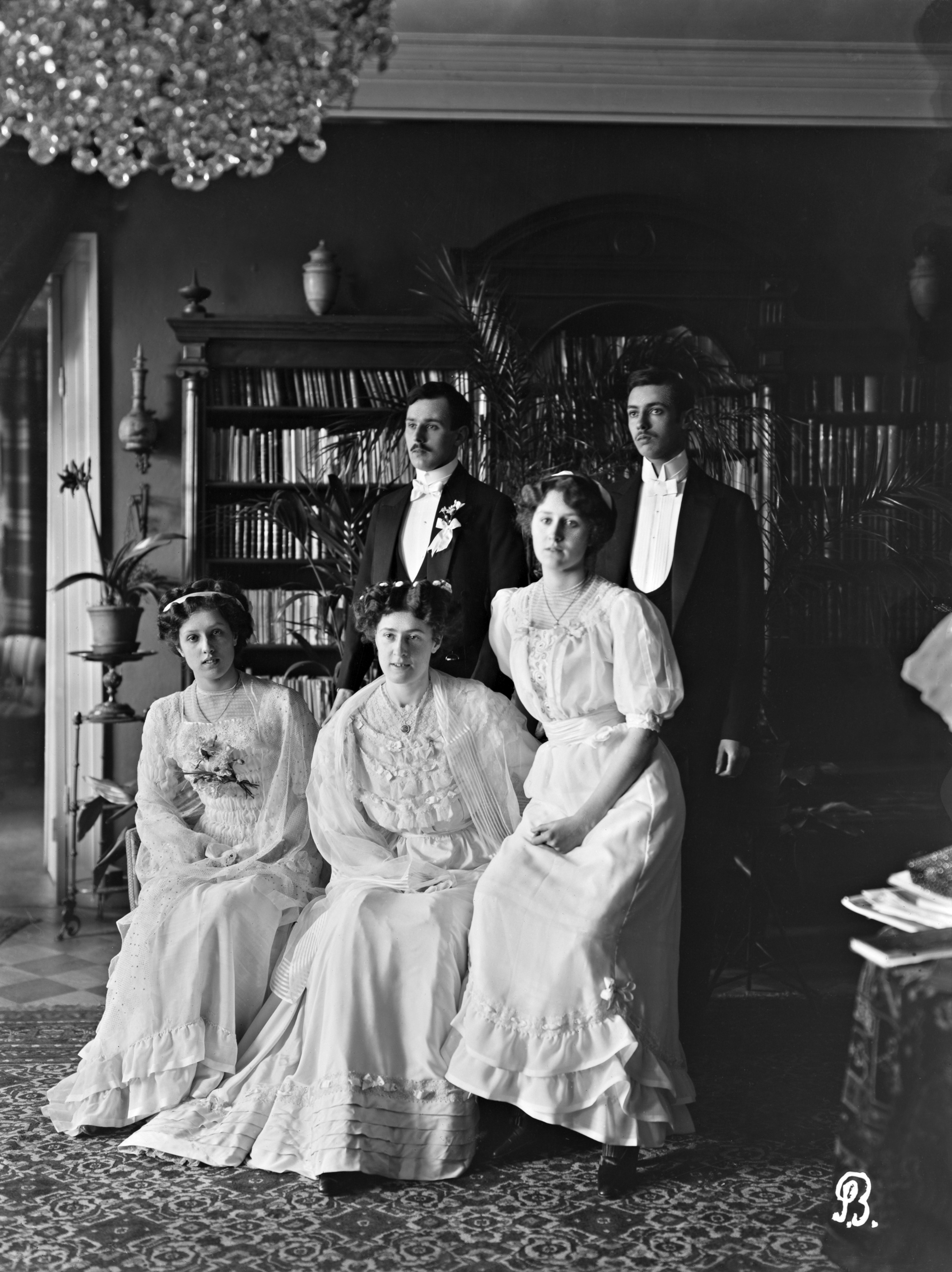
Marius af Schultén (on the right), a Finnish architect and artist with his siblings in Helsinki, 1910

Stanford White (1853–1906) was the most influential architect for high society. High society was also immortalized through the building of mansions glittered in decadence and detail that were reminiscent of the Renaissance, and the Victorian Gothic. These massive homes were visible in dense cities like New York, they sprinkled main avenues that belonged to the wealth or middle class and stayed clear of the poor areas that were dense and littered with filth and the poor working class. Richard Morris Hunt played a large role in giving many members of high society what they were looking for: homes that represented their cosmopolitan outlook and outshine all that was around it. For more on the homes of this time era see List of Gilded Age mansions.

== Sociology ==
Members of high society depend greatly on the people and social circles they are surrounded by. In many cases an elite member can confirm status by hiring servants, people who remove a mundane task from everyday life, or can patronize artists and performers, whose talent and skills are at their disposal.

Social groups play the most important role in establishing members of high society. Members of high society usually must attend social gatherings throughout the year while also putting together social gatherings in their own homes. The sociological distinction is the use of social capital in order to attend or be invited to certain events. Members of high society tend to be aware of the connections that should be made in order to move up the social ladder.

== See also ==
- Debutante
- International Debutante Ball
- Landed gentry
- Old money
- Patriarchy
- Social Register
- Socialite
- Society reporting
- Upper class
- White Anglo-Saxon Protestant
