= Too Early =

Painting by James Tissot

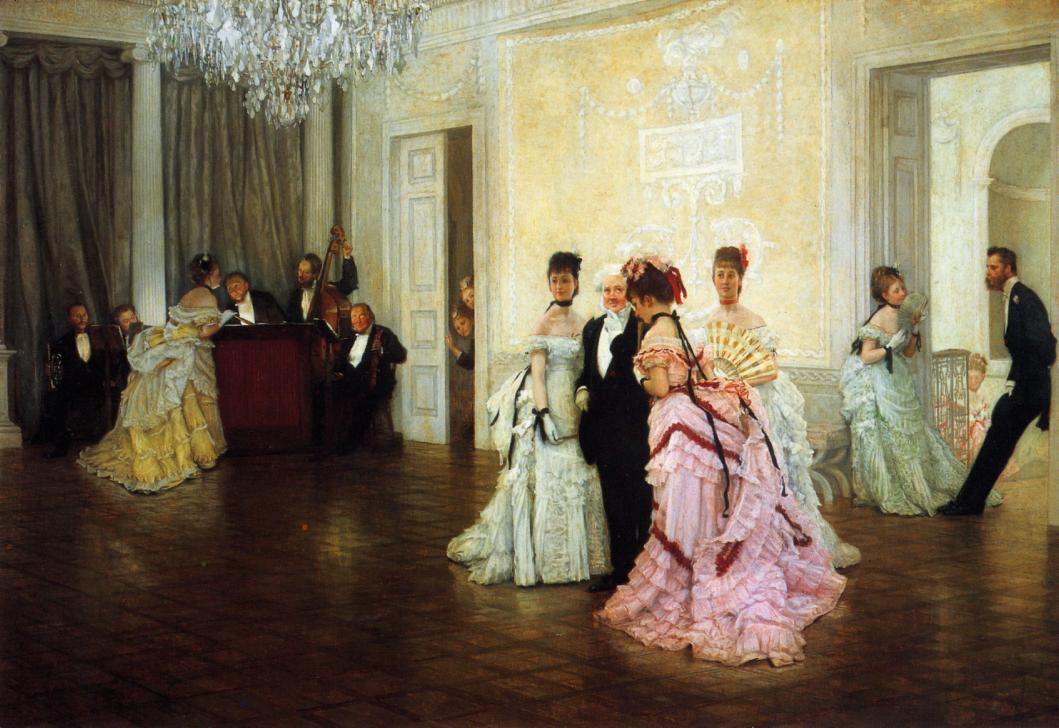
- Artist: James Tissot
- Year: 1873
- Type: Oil on canvas, genre painting
- Dimensions: 71 cm × 102 cm (28 in × 40 in)
- Location: Guildhall Art Gallery, London

Too Early is an oil on canvas genre painting by the French artist James Tissot, from 1873.

== History and description ==
It depicts a ballroom scene set in the fashionable Victorian high society with some of the guests, a father and his three daughters, having arrived embarrassingly early for the ball. Because of that the room is therefore still almost empty.

The composition is almost entirely focused on this family quartet, who stands at the front of the room, the man between the young women. They are being watched by two maids through a door in the back wall. Further to the left, beyond a crystal chandelier, their hostess is giving instructions to the orchestra. To the right, a couple awaits the start of the festivities, conversing in the entrance hall, where a new guest is seen arriving up a staircase.

Tissot had moved to London in 1871. He displayed this and another work, The Last Evening, at the Royal Academy's Summer Exhibition of 1873. Today the painting is in the collection of the Guildhall Art Gallery, in the City of London, having been acquired in 1902 by a gift from Charles Gassiot.

== Bibliography ==
- Bernstein, Susan David & Michie, Elsie B. (ed.) Victorian Vulgarity: Taste in Verbal and Visual Culture. Routledge, 2016.
- Misfeldt, Willard E. The Albums of James Tissot. Popular Press, 1982.
- Thomson, Richard. Edgar Degas: Waiting. Getty Publications, 1995.
