= In the Gulf of Venice =

Painting by Clarkson Stanfield

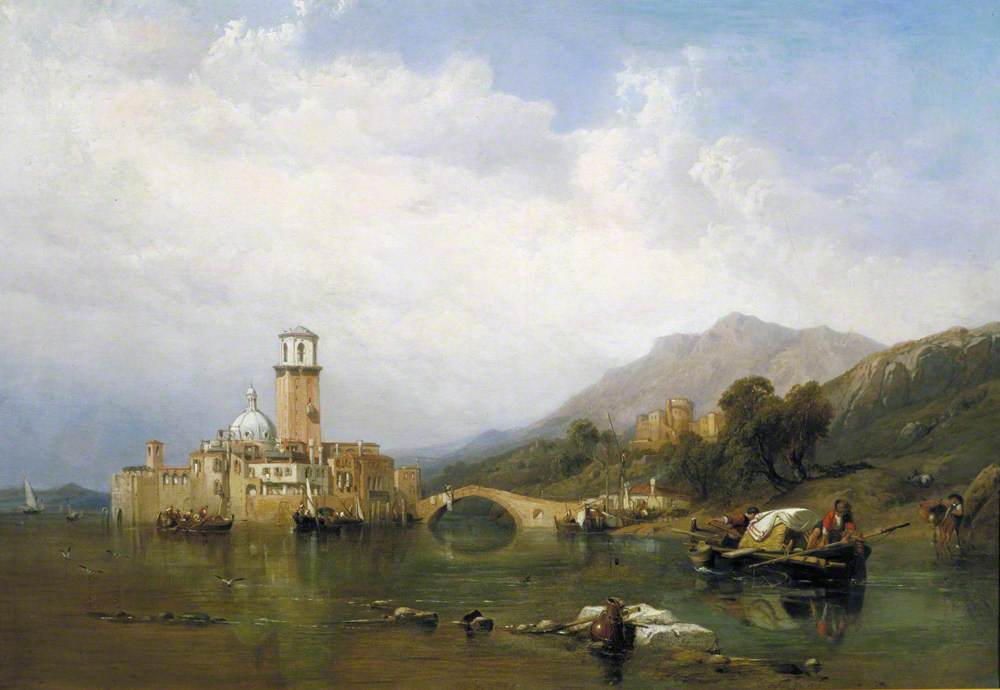
- Artist: Clarkson Stanfield
- Year: 1848
- Type: Oil on canvas, landscape painting
- Dimensions: 71 cm × 102 cm (28 in × 40 in)
- Location: Guildhall Art Gallery; London

In the Gulf of Venice is an 1848 landscape painting by the British artist Clarkson Stanfield. It depicts a view of the Gulf of Venice in the Adriatic Sea. It was likely based on a sketch Stanfield had made during a trip to Italy in 1838.

The artist was a former sailor who combined working on scenic design at the Theatre Royal, Drury Lane with producing successful seascapes. Stanfield displayed the painting at the Royal Academy's Summer Exhibition of 1848 at the National Gallery in London. Today it is in the collection of the Guildhall Art Gallery in the City of London, having been acquired in 1902 as part of a bequest by the Victorian art collector Charles Gassiot. An engraving based on the work by Robert Wallis was produced for The Art Journal in 1854.

== Bibliography ==
- Roe, Sonia & Hardy, Pat. Oil Paintings in Public Ownership in the City of London. Public Catalogue Foundation, 2009.
- Van der Merwe, Pieter & Took, Roger. The Spectacular career of Clarkson Stanfield. Tyne and Wear County Council Museums, 1979.
- Wright, Christopher, Gordon, Catherine May & Smith, Mary Peskett. British and Irish Paintings in Public Collections: An Index of British and Irish Oil Paintings by Artists Born Before 1870 in Public and Institutional Collections in the United Kingdom and Ireland. Yale University Press, 2006.
