= The Forum, Rome =

Painting by David Roberts

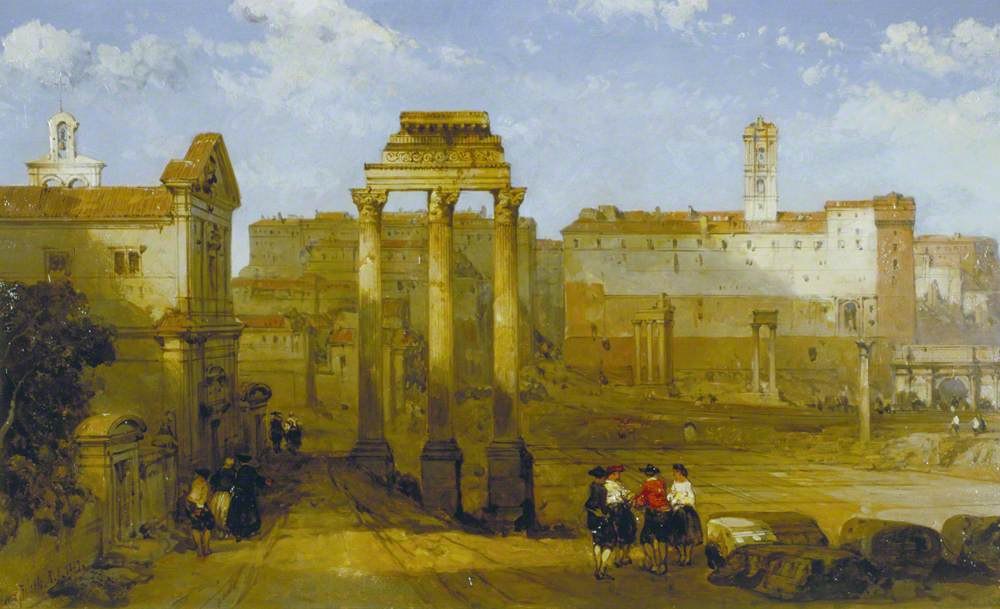
- Artist: David Roberts
- Year: 1859
- Type: Oil on panel, landscape painting
- Dimensions: 38 cm × 62 cm (15 in × 24 in)
- Location: Guildhall Art Gallery, London

The Forum, Rome is an 1859 oil painting by the British artist David Roberts. It depicts a view of the Roman Forum from the edge of the Capitoline Hill looking towards three surviving columns from the portico of the Temple of Vespasian. Roberts visited Rome in the winter of 1853. More modern buildings had recently been demolished to allow excavations of the Ancient Roman remains.

Roberts produced seven view of the forum including Ruins of the Roman Forum (now in the Wolverhampton Art Gallery).

Today the painting is in the collection of the Guildhall Art Gallery in the City of London, having been gifted by the art collector Charles Gassiot in 1902.

== Bibliography ==
- Liversidge, Michael & Edwards, Catherine. Imagining Rome British Artists and Rome in the Nineteenth Century. Merrell Holberton, 1996.
- Sim, Katherine. David Roberts R.A., 1796–1864: A Biography. Quartet Books, 1984.
