= Body (surname) =

Body is a surname. Notable people with the surname include:

- Agnes Body (b. 1866–1952), British headmistress.
- Andrew Body, American football player.
- George Body (b. 1840–1911), English canon of Durham.
- János Bódy (b. 1932), Hungarian modern pentathlete.
- Jenny Body, British Aerospace Engineer.
- Marion Body (b. 1960), American football player.
- Patrick Body (b. 1982-), American football player.
- Richard Body (1927–2018), English Politician.
