= Nine Shift =

Nine Shift: Work, Life and Education in the 21st Century (2004) is a non-fiction book about futurism. It is co-authored by William A. Draves and Julie Coates.

== Overview ==
The premise of the book is that the World Wide Web is a technology so forceful that it changes society, just as the invention of the automobile changed society 100 years ago. According to the American Association of Professional Hypnotherapists, the book provides "analysis of the transition of the agricultural age to the industrial age (1900–1920) and how it parallels the transition from the industrial age to the information age (2000–2020). This book, published in 2004, has, according to the American Association of Professional Hypnotherapists, proven itself prophetic and accurate."

All of these changes are taking place within just 20 years, between 2000 and 2020, say the authors, just like the major inventions and changes of the Industrial Age took place between 1900 and 1920. The authors say that about 75% of life will be different in 2020, just like about 75% of life was different in 1920 than in 1900. The term Nine Shift derives from the notion that of the 24 hours in a day, about 12 hours are discretionary and nine of those hours will be spent differently by the average person in 2020 as compared to 2000.

Draves and Coates then describe nine major shifts taking place during this transition time between the Industrial Age and the Information Age. They are:

- People work from home.
- Intranets replace offices.
- Networks replace pyramids.
- Trains replace cars.
- Dense neighborhoods replace suburbs.
- New social infrastructures evolve.
- Cheating becomes collaboration.
- Half of all learning is online.
- Education becomes web-based.

== Reception ==
In 2005, the BBC sent its Global Business reporter Peter Day to River Falls, Wisconsin, to interview Draves and Coates. In 2007 the book was translated into Russian.
