= Escrick Park =

School building in Escrick, Selby, England

Coordinates: 53°52′22″N 1°02′25″W

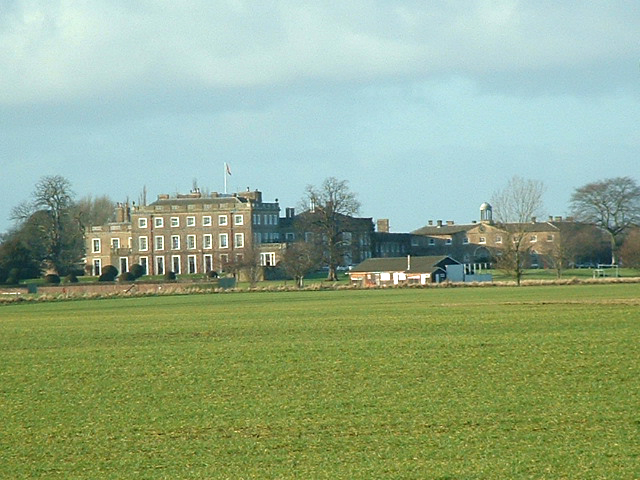
The house, in 2006

Escrick Park is a historic building and country estate in Escrick, a village in North Yorkshire, in England.

The estate was formed by Picot de Lascelles in the mid 12th century, and a manor house was first recorded in 1323. It descended through the family until 1668, when Edward Howard, 1st Baron Howard of Escrick sold it to Henry Thompson. Thompson's son, also Henry Thompson, rebuilt the country house at the centre of the estate in the 1680s. It originally resembled nearby Bell Hall. In 1758, and again in about 1765, John Carr of York extended the house, for Beilby Thompson. His work included the north range, more than twice as long as the original house; a detached stable block; and remodelling of the interior. A northwest wing was completed in 1848, and a link to Carr's stable block was built in 1850. In addition, a conservatory was constructed, and the east side was extended, providing a new entrance hall and larger dining room.

In 1898, Thompson's descendents purchased Skipwith Hall, and in 1929 they made it their main residence, converting Escrick Park into flats. 1949, the house was instead leased to Queen Margaret's School, which purchased the building in 1974. The house has been grade II* listed since 1951.

The house is rendered with stone dressings. The Carr extension is in brick, and it has a hipped Welsh slate roof. The main block has three storeys and seven bays, flanked by single-storey single-bay extensions, and with two-storey rear wings, the right with three bays and the left with four bays. The entrance on the right has a portico with four Ionic columns, a frieze, a cornice and a balustrade. The main range has floor bands, a moulded modillion cornice, a frieze, and a balustrade with urns on the corners. The windows in the ground floor are casements, above are sash windows, and all have architraves. In the Carr range are canted bay windows.

Inside the house, remains of Carr's decorative scheme include the main staircase; plasterwork including half of the ceiling in the entrance hall, and the ceiling, cornice and frieze in the dining room; and the panelling in the dining room. There is a late 18th century fireplace made of yellow and white marble, probably designed by John Fisher, and a library with built-in bookshelves, a gilded ceiling and cornices, which was probably designed by Edward Blore.

Carr's coach house and stable block is separately listed at grade II*. It is built of brick with stone dressings, rendered on the front, and with a Welsh slate roof. It has four ranges with a square plan around an open courtyard. The south range has two storeys, and nine bays projecting slightly under a dentilled pediment containing a clock. The range has a plinth, a continuous impost band, a dentilled cornice and a hipped roof. On the front are three recessed arched with moulded heads, and sash windows. On the roof is a cupola with Doric columns and a domed lead roof. The other ranges have a single storey.

The grounds of the estate were laid out in the late 18th and early 19th century, and as part of the process, much of the village of Escrick was demolished and rebuilt on new sites. The kitchen garden has been demolished, with houses built on the site in the 1990s, but most of the remainder of the estate survives. Various structures in the grounds are listed, including the Garden Temple, a former cottage, and various gates, lodges, and garden urns.

== See also ==
- Grade II* listed buildings in North Yorkshire (district)
- Listed buildings in Escrick
