= St Paul's Cathedral with the Lord Mayor's Procession =

Painting by David Roberts

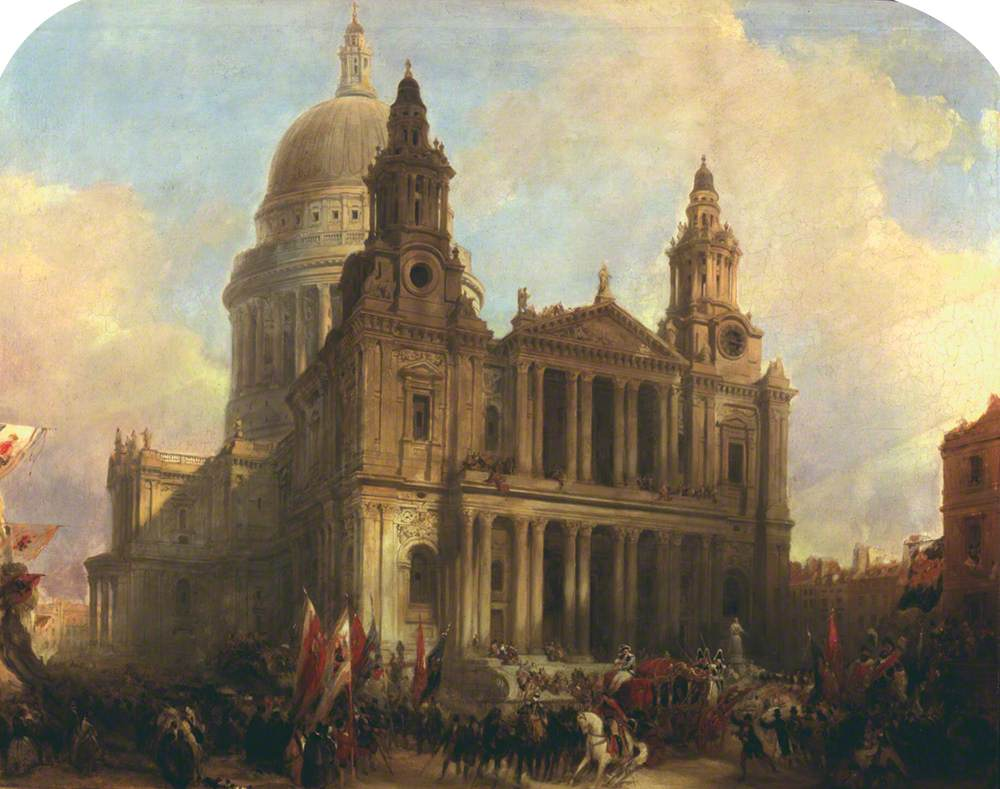
- Artist: David Roberts
- Year: 1836
- Type: Oil on panel, landscape painting
- Dimensions: 61 cm × 76 cm (24 in × 30 in)
- Location: Guildhall Art Gallery; London

St Paul's Cathedral with the Lord Mayor's Procession is an 1836 landscape painting by the British artist David Roberts. A cityscape, it depicts the annual Lord Mayor's Procession in London with St Paul's Cathedral in the background.

Roberts became known for his paintings of Southern Europe and Orientalist views of the Near East, but he also produced a number of depictions of landscapes of his native Britain. The painting is now in the collection of the Guildhall Art Gallery in the City of London, having been bequeathed by Mrs. Pitman-Lovell in 1918.

== See also ==
- The Ninth of November, 1888, an 1890 painting by William Logsdail also featuring the Lord Mayors Procession.

== Bibliography ==
- Roe, Sonia & Hardy, Pat. Oil Paintings in Public Ownership in the City of London. Public Catalogue Foundation, 2009.
- Sim, Katherine. David Roberts R.A., 1796–1864: A Biography. Quartet Books, 1984.
- Wright, Christopher, Gordon, Catherine May & Smith, Mary Peskett. British and Irish Paintings in Public Collections: An Index of British and Irish Oil Paintings by Artists Born Before 1870 in Public and Institutional Collections in the United Kingdom and Ireland. Yale University Press, 2006.
