= Lincoln Christ's Hospital School =

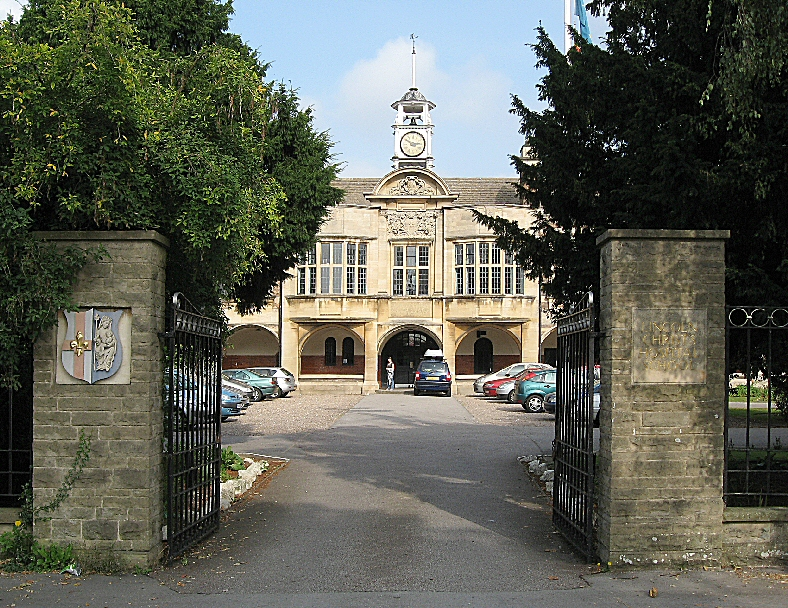

Location
- Wragby Road; Lincoln, Lincolnshire, LN2 4PN; England; 53°14′21″N 0°31′21″W

Information
- Type: Academy
- Religious affiliation: Christian
- Established: 1974
- Department for Education URN: 137447 Tables
- Ofsted: Reports
- Head teacher: Martin Mckeown
- Gender: Coeducational
- Age: 11 to 18
- Enrolment: 1,266
- Houses: Bluecoats, Minster, Lindum, Greyfriars
- Colours: Blue, yellow, green, red
- Former name: Lincoln School,
- Website: http://www.christs-hospital.lincs.sch.uk

Lincoln Christ's Hospital School is an English state secondary school with academy status located in Wragby Road in Lincoln. It was established in 1974, taking over the pupils and many of the staff of the older Lincoln Grammar School and Christ's Hospital Girls' High School (established in 1893), and two 20th-century secondary modern schools, St Giles's and Myle Cross.

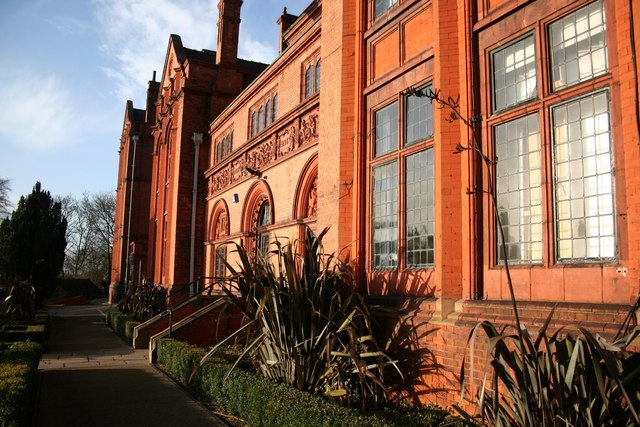
Former Christ's Hospital Foundation Girls' School on Greestone Place

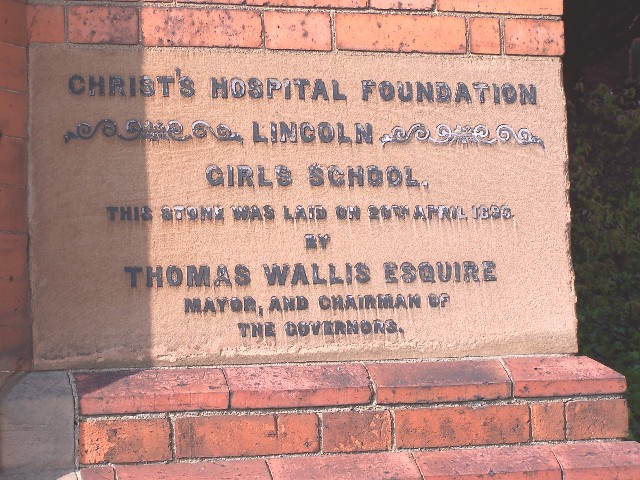
Foundation stone of former girls' school

== History ==
Hospital schools date from the 13th century as boys' schools for parents who could not afford to pay school fees. They were also known as charity schools. The former Lincoln School may have dated from the 11th century, but it was re-founded as a charity school in the 17th century.

The endowment for Christ's Hospital Girls' School was derived from the former Bluecoat School on Christ's Hospital Terrace, Lincoln which was closed in 1883. This school was originally established in 1614 in St. Mary's Guildhall, Lincoln before it was moved to Christ Hospital Terrace in 1623. In September 1893 Lincoln Christ's Hospital Girls' High School was started, with Agnes Body as its headmistress.

=== Grammar schools ===
LCHS was formed from the merger of two single-sex grammar schools, both of which had some boarders. From 1906 the boys' school, Lincoln School (probably dating back to 1090), also known as Lincoln Grammar School, occupied a site on Wragby Road. The girls' school, Christ's Hospital Girls' High School, was founded in 1893 and was based at Greestone Place on Lindum Hill.

During the First World War, the building was requisitioned by the War Office to create the 4th Northern General Hospital, a facility for the Royal Army Medical Corps to treat military casualties.

Lincoln Cathedral choristers were educated at the school until the mid-20th century; the Cathedral School for Boys, now known as Lincoln Minster School, subsequently took over that role.

On 22 July 1941 an RAF Handley Page Hampden crashed into the boarding house of the Girls' High School on Greestone Stairs, killing Miss Edith Catherine Fowle, a languages teacher, as well as the occupants of the aircraft.

The school entered the BBC Young Scientists of the Year in 1972. The team had been noticed by BBC staff at the Lincolnshire Science Fair in November 1971. The team was Chris Dennison, aged 18, of Hawthorn Road; Chris O'Brien, age 18, of Riseholme Road; and Dave Smith, aged 17, of Manor Drive. All three took Physics, Chemistry and Biology A-levels. The team appeared on 13 March 1972. The team got to the final, recorded in Birmingham. Head of science, Ivan Sexton, and biology teacher, Andrew Brylewski, had helped the team.

The final was shown on 27 March 1972, being recorded on Monday 20 March 1972. The team won the final, with 230 points, the other teams, Danum Grammar School from Doncaster and a school from Dorset, received 224 and 223. The team went to a science fair in the Netherlands in May 1972, and received a £350 prize. The topic of the team was about sowing wild oats.

=== Comprehensive ===
In December 1971, a new headteacher was appointed for the new combined school, 49 year old Henry Arthur Behenna, the headmaster since 1968 of Grove School, Market Drayton in Shropshire. He had difficulties at his previous school in Shropshire, when he sacked the 42 year old head of drama, from his £2,200 job, for not teaching the expected syllabus, as the drama teacher wanted a more 'modern' syllabus, with 'free expression'; 200 children subsequently went on a banner-waving protest throughout the town, to reinstate the drama teacher, but the teacher was not reinstated. The dispute lasted until May 1971. At the time, Shropshire county council were more interested in how the school's results had plummeted over five years since becoming a comprehensive He grew up in Mevagissey, and attended St Austell County Grammar School, taking a Geography degree at Worcester College, Oxford, and had served in the RAF Air Sea Rescue Service (Royal Air Force Marine Branch) in the war, then taught from 1959 at Melbourn Village College, where he became headteacher.

In September 1974 the City of Lincoln was the only part of the county in which Lincolnshire County Council decided to abolish selective education. As a result, the city's two grammar schools merged with two secondary modern schools founded in 1933, St Giles's Secondary Modern School for Boys on Swift Gardens and Myle Cross Secondary Modern School for Girls on Addison Drive, to become a new comprehensive school. The buildings of St Giles's are now a temporary primary school, and those of Myle Cross are the Chad Varah Primary School.

The deputy head, Mrs Bobbie Coxon-Butler, the former last deputy head of the High School for Girls, left the school in 1975 to become head of Hallcroft Secondary Girls School in Retford in September 1975, which merged in 1979 with the Retford High School for Girls to form a coeducational comprehensive, and she became the headteacher. She had trained at Warton College of Education in Lancashire, and was headteacher at Retford until 1987.

The present-day school has had Language College status since 2001, and offers lessons in French, Spanish, and German.

=== Academy ===
Lincoln Christ's Hospital School became an academy in September 2011. It is now independent of local authority control, and funded directly from central government. However, the school continues to coordinate its admissions with Lincolnshire County Council.

=== Heads of Lincoln Grammar or Free School ===
==== At the Lincoln Greyfriars ====
- 1576 Mr Plumtre
- 1585 William Temple. Later secretary to Sir Philip Sidney and Provost of Trinity College, Dublin.
- 1593/4 Mr Nethercotes
- 1597 Mr Mason
- 1601-10 Robert Houghton
- 1616 John Phipps
- 1624-1652 Nathaniel Clarke
- 1656-1665 Mr Umfrevile
- 1681 Mr Bromsgrove
- 1683 Mr France
- 1663 Mr Gibson
- 1704-1724 Rev Samuel Garmston
- 1724 -1742 Mr John Goodall
- 1752- ? Rev. Mr Rolt
- 1765-91 Re. John Hewthwaite
- 1792-1821 Rev John Carter
- 1828-50 Rev James Adcock
- 1852–1857: Revd George Foster Simpson, previously the first Rector of the High School of Montreal
- 1857-1875. Rev. John Fowler.

==== Greyfriars and Upper Lindum Terrace ====
- 1857–1875: Revd John Fowler.
- 1875-?1883 Rev A Babington. Headmaster of the Classical School
- 1875-1897 Rev Robert Markham. Headmaster of the Middle School in the Greyfriars
- 1883-1897 William Weekes Fowler. Headmaster of the Lincoln Classical School on Upper Lindum Terrace.
- 1898 -?1906 F H Chambers. Head master of Lincoln Grammar School on Upper Lindum Terrace.

==== Wragby Road ====
- 1911–1929: Reginald Moxon
- 1929–1937: Rev Charles Edgar Young; he became the headmaster of Rossall School, in Lancashire, until 1957
- September 1937 – 1957: George Frederic Franklin; the 39 year old, attended the Roan School in London, followed by King's College, Cambridge, where he read Modern and Medieval Languages, then taught for one year at Merchant Taylors in Merseyside, then at Christ's Hospital in Sussex; he was a friend of the headteacher of the City School
- January 1958 – 1962: Patrick Martin (later headmaster of Warwick School, 1962–77); he studied modern history at Balliol College, Oxford, teaching at Workington Grammar School in the late 1940s
- September 1962 – 1973: John Collins Faull (later headmaster of Tewkesbury School, 1972–?); the 36 year old was the head of Maths at the Royal Grammar School Worcester; he was the head boy of Truro School in 1943, and trained at Moray House School of Education and Sport, then taught at Strathallan School for two years, then at Durham School for four years, and at Worcester from 1954
- 1973–1974: Arthur Behenna

=== Heads of Christ's Hospital School for Girls ===
- 1893- : Miss Agnes Body, the founding headmistress
- 1943-64: Miss I.V. Cleave; the 38 year old had been head of modern languages at Cheltenham Ladies College, had attended Winchester House School in Sussex, followed by modern languages at Girton College, Cambridge followed by a diploma in education, then she taught from 1926-33 at Portsmouth Girls High School
- 1964-70: Miss Maureen Leahy; the 33 year old had attended an Altrincham school, then taken Latin at Westfield College, followed by a PGCE, then taught at Manchester High School for Girls, then became deputy head at King Edward VI Handsworth School, being head of classics; she left in July 1970, aged 39, to become the head of The King's High School for Girls in Warwickshire; she left Warwickshire in July 1987
- 1970-74: Mrs Sheila Margaret Wood; the 42 year old was the head of English at Adwick School, in the north of Doncaster, and previously when the school was the Percy Jackson Grammar School, before 1968; Sheila became the head of another comprehensive from September 1974

=== Heads of Lincoln Christ's Hospital School ===
- 1974–1985: Arthur Behenna
- September 1985 – 2004: David Cox
- 2005–2014: Andy Wright
- 2014–present: Martin Mckeown

== Curriculum ==
Academic subjects studied include: English, Maths, Double and Triple Award Sciences, BTEC Science, Forensic and Medical Sciences,* Media, Modern Languages, History, Geography, RE, Psychology,* Sociology, Philosophy and Ethics,* and Citizenship.

Vocational subjects studied include Fine Art, Art Textiles, BTEC Art, Music, Design & Technology, Drama, Drama & Theatre Studies,* Law,* ICT & Business Studies, Resistant Materials, Child Care, Electronics, Product Design,* Production Arts BTEC,* Performance Arts BTE,* Graphic Design, Photography and Engineering.*

(*) 6th form only subject.

== Academic performance ==
When a grammar school, LCHS would have been the best performing school in Lincoln. As a comprehensive, its results place it in the top five most improved language colleges nationally. It gets GCSE results slightly above average, but A level results below average.

== Admissions ==
Pupil population is just under 1,400, including over 300 in the sixth form. Of the school roll, 15 per cent receive free school meals.

== Notable former pupils ==
- Allison Pearson (born 1960), novelist and newspaper columnist
- Sandra Troop, canoeist at the 1992 Summer Olympics (1977–84)
- Marlon Beresford (born 1969), professional footballer with Middlesbrough F.C., Burnley F.C. and Luton Town F.C.: 1982–86
- Paul Palmer, Olympic silver medal-winning swimmer at Atlanta: c. 1986

=== Lincoln Grammar School ===
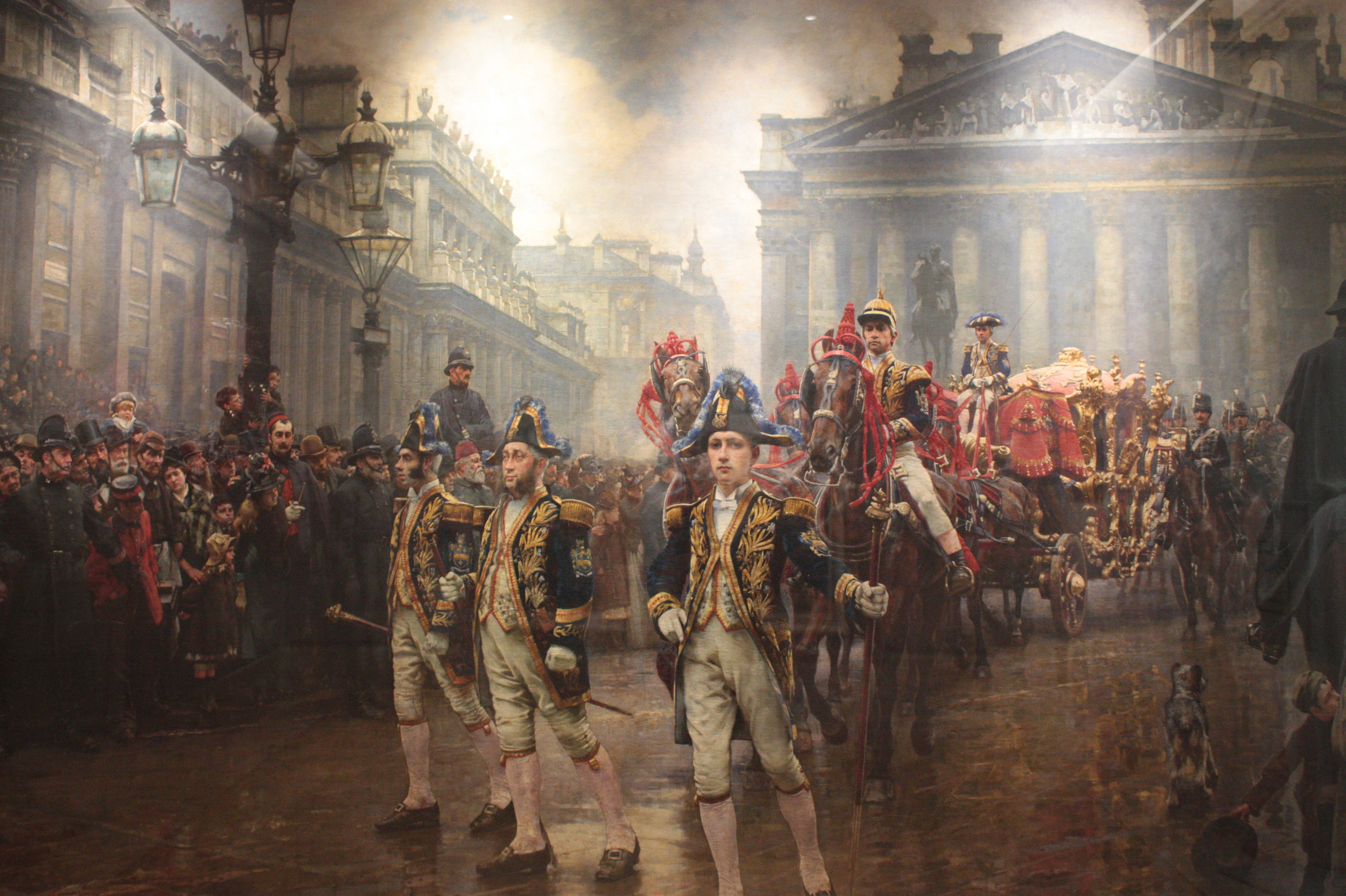
The Ninth of November, 1888 by William Logsdail

- Colonel John Hutchinson (1615–1664) Parliamentarian leader
- Sir Francis Thornhagh (1617–1648), Parliamentarian soldier and MP: c. 1628–33
- John Disney (1677–1730), churchman, and great-grandfather of John Disney the archaeologist: c. 1689–94
- Peniston Booth, FRS (1681 – 1765), Dean of Windsor.
- Thomas Pownall, Governor of Massachusetts in 1757–60: c. 1733–38
- John Sibthorp, botanist: c. 1770–75
- Henry Digby Beste, Christian scholar: 1776–84
- Richard Watson, Methodist minister: c. 1792–97
- John Taylor (English publisher): c. 1792–94
- Henry Whitehead Moss, scholar: c. 1852–54
- Evelyn Abbott, Greek scholar: c. 1854–59
- George Francis Carline (1855–1920), RBA artist: 1866–73
- William Henry Battle, surgeon, known for Battle's sign: c. 1866–70
- James Ward Usher (1845–1921), art jeweller and philanthropist
- William Logsdail, artist: c. 1870–75
- Robert Humphreys OBE, director of Institute of Latin American Studies, 1965–74, and President of the Royal Historical Society, 1964–68: 1908–15
- Basil Boothroyd, humorous writer with Punch: c. 1921–26
- Alex Henshaw, Spitfire chief test pilot: 1922–27
- Flt Lt Edward Johnson DFC, bomb aimer of AJ-N Lancaster of the Dambuster 617 Sqn squadron, who destroyed the Eder Dam: 1923–30
- Noel Duckworth, coxed the 1934–36 Cambridge crews to victory in the Boat Race, and the 1936 Berlin Olympics GB Eight: 1924–31
- David Cartwright, Bishop of Southampton, 1984–89: 1931–38
- Steve Race (1921–2009), Home Service/Radio 4 presenter of My Music: 1932–39
- Sir Neville Marriner (1924–2016) CH CBE, conductor: 1935–42
- Dr Dennis Townhill (1925–2008) OBE, organist:St. Mary's Episcopal Cathedral, Edinburgh.1936–43
- Keith Fordyce, Light Programme/Radio 2 disc jockey and first presenter of Ready Steady Go!: 1940–47
- David Robinson, arts journalist for The Times: 1941–48
- Michael Marshall (born 1936), Bishop of Woolwich 1975–84: 1947–54
- Colin Semper (born 1938), head of Religious Programmes 1966–69 at BBC Radio: 1949–57
- Sir David Blatherwick OBE (born 1941), UK Ambassador to Ireland and Egypt: 1952–59
- Derek Fatchett (1945–1999), Labour MP 1983–99 for Leeds Central: 1956–63
- Peter Day (1947–2023), Home Service/Radio 4 presenter of In Business: 1958–65
- Mark Byford (born 1958), BBC deputy director-general: 1969–76
- John Hurt (1940-2017), actor: c. 1952–57 (boarder)

=== Christ's Hospital Girls' High School ===
- Bridget Cracroft-Eley (née Clifton-Brown), Lord Lieutenant of Lincolnshire 1995–2008: 1940s
- Nancy Durrell (née Myers), first wife of Lawrence Durrell, and mother of Joanna Hines, the author and Guardian crime fiction reviewer
- Mary Mackie (née Whitlam), novelist and non-fiction writer: 1953–58
- Lorraine Peters, actress (Maureen Petchey, 1935–99), grew up at 97 Newark Road, appeared in Emmerdale and Coronation Street, attended RADA with Albert Finney
- Janet Prictoe, lived on Longdales Road, 800m runner in the mid-1980s

== Sister school ==
- China: Hebei Tangshan Foreign Language School
