= Druie Bowett =

English artist

- Born: Drucilla Glover; 1924; Ripon, North Yorkshire
- Died: 4 December 1998, aged 74
- Education: Queen Margaret's School, York, Harrogate School of Art
- Known for: Antique, life drawing, landscape painting, abstract art
- Spouse: John Bowett
- Elected: Fellow of the Royal Society of Arts

Druie Bowett (1924–1998) was an English artist who was a member of The Midland Group and Women's International Art Club, and Fellow of the Royal Society of Arts.

== Life and career ==
Born Drucilla Glover in Ripon, North Yorkshire in 1924, Bowett attended the Queen Margaret's School, York before studying at the Harrogate School of Art under John Cooper, a pupil of Walter Sickert. She became a close friend of Hungarian artist Jean-Georges Simon during her time at Harrogate, and later worked alongside notable artists such as Henry Moore, Graham Sutherland, Terry Frost and Prunella Clough. She was an active member of the prestigious Midland Group - 'a regionally influential collective of Modernist painters based in Nottingham with links to the St Ives School and Wilhelmina Barns-Graham' - and through this formed an enduring friendship with its founding member, Evelyn Gibbs. She married John Bowett in 1943, whose death in 1994 inspired 'an extraordinary series of paintings' shown at the Pierrepoint Gallery, Nottinghamshire.

Alongside her artistic career, Bowett had many public responsibilities including acting as 'committee member, then chair, of the governing bodies of Chesterfield and Loughborough Colleges of Art and Design', and was later elected Fellow of the Royal Society of Arts.

== Art ==
Bowett's early work drew from antique, life drawing and industrial and pastoral landscape, with her focus at the Harrogate School of Art being on Fine Art. During her studies, she became profoundly influenced by the Hungarian artist Jean-Georges Simon, whose work 'opened her eyes to a wider European modern style of clean bright colour and formal discipline', and informed the 'confident abstraction' of her later work. An active member of The Midland Group, her paintings featured in many of their exhibitions held in Nottingham between 1940-60. During the 1950s, Bowett's work became increasingly abstractionist, with 'a hard-won clarity and abstraction of form [being] achieved during the 1960s in such paintings as Brown and Yellow and Wookery'. In 1957 she was included as one of the 'Young Artists of Promise' in Jack Beddington's book. Bowett's paintings in her 1995 exhibition, 'Given Space', at the Cartwright Hall, Bradford, were described as having shown her to be 'a painter at the height of her powers...[showing] bravura displays of colour, light and form, about sensations of space, nearness and distance'.

Bowett exhibited consistently over five decades, with exhibitions at the Royal Academy of Arts, the Paris Salon, the Royal Society of Arts and the Royal Society of Portrait Painters.
