= Mary Mackie =

English fiction and non-fiction writer, born early 1940s

Mary Mackie (née Kathleen Mary Whitlam, born early 1940s) is an English writer of over 70 fiction and non-fiction books since 1971. Work of hers has been translated into 20 languages. She is known especially for light-hearted accounts of life looking after a country house for the National Trust.

== Life ==
Mary Mackie was born in Lincoln during the Second World War, as the older daughter of Charles William Edward Whitlam, and his wife Kathleen. The family lived on Carholme Road until 1959 when they moved to North Hykeham, south of the city. Mary began writing stories, poems and playlets (unpublished) at the age of eight. She was educated at St Faith's Primary and Junior School and Lincoln Christ's Hospital High School, leaving at 16 with six "O" levels. She worked for a time as an accounts clerk with an insurance company. Later, she locally enlisted in the WRAF and worked in the Accounts section at RAF Waddington, where she met her future husband.

Early in her marriage to RAF Sergeant Christopher (Chris) Mackie, Mary and her family spent some time stationed at RAF Gatow, in Berlin (a city then still divided by the Wall), and later in West Germany, where she wrote her first full-length novel. She was first published in 1971. Chris retired from the RAF as a warrant officer and they settled into civilian life near Lincoln.

Mary Mackie now lives at Heacham near Hunstanton on the Norfolk coast of England. Her husband had been evacuated there during the Second World War, at the age of 10, and they returned to the village in 1990. The couple had two sons and there are now four grandchildren. Mary Mackie continues to write. Her husband, a keen amateur archaeologist, was associated from its inception in 1996 with the Sedgeford Historical and Archaeological Research Project. Mackie's biography of him, Chris, appeared in 2013. He died in August 2014.

== Work ==
Mary Mackie's books Cobwebs and Cream Teas (1990), Dry Rot and Daffodils (1994) and Frogspawn and Floor Polish (2003) are light-hearted accounts of life in the North Norfolk National Trust property Felbrigg Hall, where her husband was houseman (administrator) for seven years up to 1990.

Another non-fiction book of hers that attracted notice was The Prince's Thorn (2008), about Louisa Mary Cresswell (1830–1916), whose autobiographical Eighteen Years on Sandringham Estate by "The Lady Farmer" (1887) was bitterly critical of Edward, Prince of Wales and his circle. However, Mary Mackie's new researches, including two days spent working in the Royal Archive at Windsor, proved that there was a different side to this story.

Having written a commissioned history of Princess Mary's Royal Air Force Nursing Service entitled Sky Wards (2001 revised edition Wards in the Sky, 2014), Mary Mackie wrote a short illustrated book for the Highlanders' Museum in Ardersier, Scotland, entitled Hunstanton's Highland Heroes. It tells how soldiers of the Queen's Own Cameron Highlanders were headquartered in Hunstanton while training for active service in 1915.

Mackie's historical novel The People of the Horse (1987), about Queen Boudicca of the Iceni, was translated into Czech and Hungarian. Three more, set in Victorian Norfolk, were Sandringham Rose (1992), A Child of Secrets (1993) and The Clouded Land (1994).

Some of her earlier romantic novels were written under the pseudonyms Cathy Christopher, Alex Andrews, Cathy Charles and Caroline Charles. Books of hers have been published in twenty languages.

== External sources ==
- Mary Mackie, 20 July 2012 at eagleeyededitor.wordpress.com
- A review of Cobwebs and Cream Teas, Retrieved 19 November 2013. at plaingeets.wordpress.com
