= Grove School, Market Drayton =

The Grove School

Location
- Newcastle Road; Market Drayton, Shropshire, TF9 1HF; England; 52°54′21″N 2°28′38″W

Information
- School type: Academy Secondary School
- Motto: A Mindset To Succeed
- Established: 1555 (as Market Drayton Grammar School nr. Phoenix Bank) 1965 (as The Grove Comprehensive School on current site at Newcastle Rd)
- Status: Open
- Local authority: Shropshire Council
- Trust: Marches Academy Trust
- Department for Education URN: 146580 Tables
- Ofsted: Reports
- Chair of Local Governing Body: Robert Hewer
- Headteacher: Mitchell Allsopp
- Gender: Coeducational
- Age: 11 to 18
- Enrolment: 950
- Hours in school day: 7 1/3
- Colour: Blue
- Website: Official website

Grove School is a coeducational secondary school and sixth form located in Market Drayton, Shropshire, England, for pupils aged between 11 and 18.

Grove School is Market Drayton's only secondary school. The school has facilities including large sports and playing fields and a sixth form college that has recently been transformed into a Year 7 area to help the new enrollers to adapt to Secondary School life before heading to the main building in Year 8, while the sixth formers are in a different part of the site.

== History ==
The school was formed from Market Drayton Grammar School. The new school opened on Tuesday September 14 1965, with 950 and 47 full-time teachers. The chairman of the governors did not want a comprehensive school.

A £90,000 science block opened in January 1966, with a 60-seat lecture theatre. In early October 1966 Oswestry MP John Biffen visited the school.

From 1968 to 1973 the headteacher was Arthur Behenna. In 1970, the school was one of 30 schools experimenting with the Nuffield Spanish course.

The 42-year-old head of drama, Raymond G Gregory, was appointed head of drama in 1967, but in early 1970, his department was to be taken over by the English department, and 75% of the syllabus was to be literary. Mr Gregory said many of these texts were from the 1930s, had written a complaint to the Times Educational Supplement, and at a PTA meeting had offended the headteacher, causing disruption at the meeting. In December 1970 the chairman of the LEA, Colonel A F Sykes, had decided that Mr Gregory must leave his £2,200 job, for not teaching the expected syllabus, as the drama teacher wanted a more 'modern' syllabus, with 'free expression'. A county councillor, Warren Hawksley, questioned Mr Gregory about discipline, and if he believed in any. Mr Gregory answered that he did not believe in discipline, only self-discipline. Mr Gregory did not like the school governors, calling them 'a closed group'. Mark Suttery was chairman of the governors. The deputy headmaster Martin Ridgway supported Mr Gregory.

200 children subsequently went on a banner-waving protest throughout the town, to reinstate the drama teacher, on Thursday December 17 1970, and gathered outside the headmaster's window, chanting slogans, but the teacher was not reinstated.

In March 1971 government inspectors conducted a four-day inspection. The dispute lasted until May 1971. At the time, Shropshire County Council was more interested in how the school's results had plummeted over five years since becoming a comprehensive.

=== Academy ===
In December 2018, the school converted to an academy as part of the Marches Academy Trust. Mitchell Allsopp was appointed as headteacher in January 2024.

== Headteachers ==
- c.1936, H Alfred Hesketh, his wife died on June 20 1956, aged 54, due to a lung condition, after an operation on her nose
- January 1957, Mr Albert Frederick Tongue, aged 39, head of the grammar school, from Northampton Grammar School, he attended Wolverhampton Grammar School, with a Classics degree from the University of Birmingham in 1939, he died in November 1964
- September 1964, Donald N Mackay (March 24 1924 -2018) aged 40, he had been for four years the head of the Lower School at Monks Park Secondary School (now Orchard School Bristol), and previously head of History at King Edward's School, Bath since 1958, he attended Kingswood School in Bath. In 1968 Mackay was appointed as head of Wanstead County High School, to turn the school comprehensive. In 1975 Mackay encountered some controversy, when as a 51-year-old grandfather, with two daughters, he eloped with a 19-year-old former Wanstead sixth-former, leaving his 48-year-old primary headteacher wife of 29 years; the sixth-former now studied opera at the Guildhall School of Music and Drama, and married her in February 1976 at the Kensington and Chelsea Register Office. Mackay died on February 14 2018
- January 1969, Arthur Behenna, aged 45, with a 17 year-old son, and 14-year-old daughter, he grew up in Mevagissey, and attended St Austell County Grammar School, taking a Geography degree at Worcester College, Oxford, and had served in the RAF Air Sea Rescue Service (Royal Air Force Marine Branch) in the Second World War, then taught from 1959 at Melbourn Village College, where he became headteacher. He was against the 11-plus system, as many local parents, with able children, took those children out of Market Drayton, and believed in the 'comprehensive principle', giving talks on the subject.. His daughter studied English at Swansea. He became headteacher of Lincoln School, a boys' grammar school, in 1973. He left Lincoln Christ's Hospital School in 1985.
