= Atholl Palace Hotel =

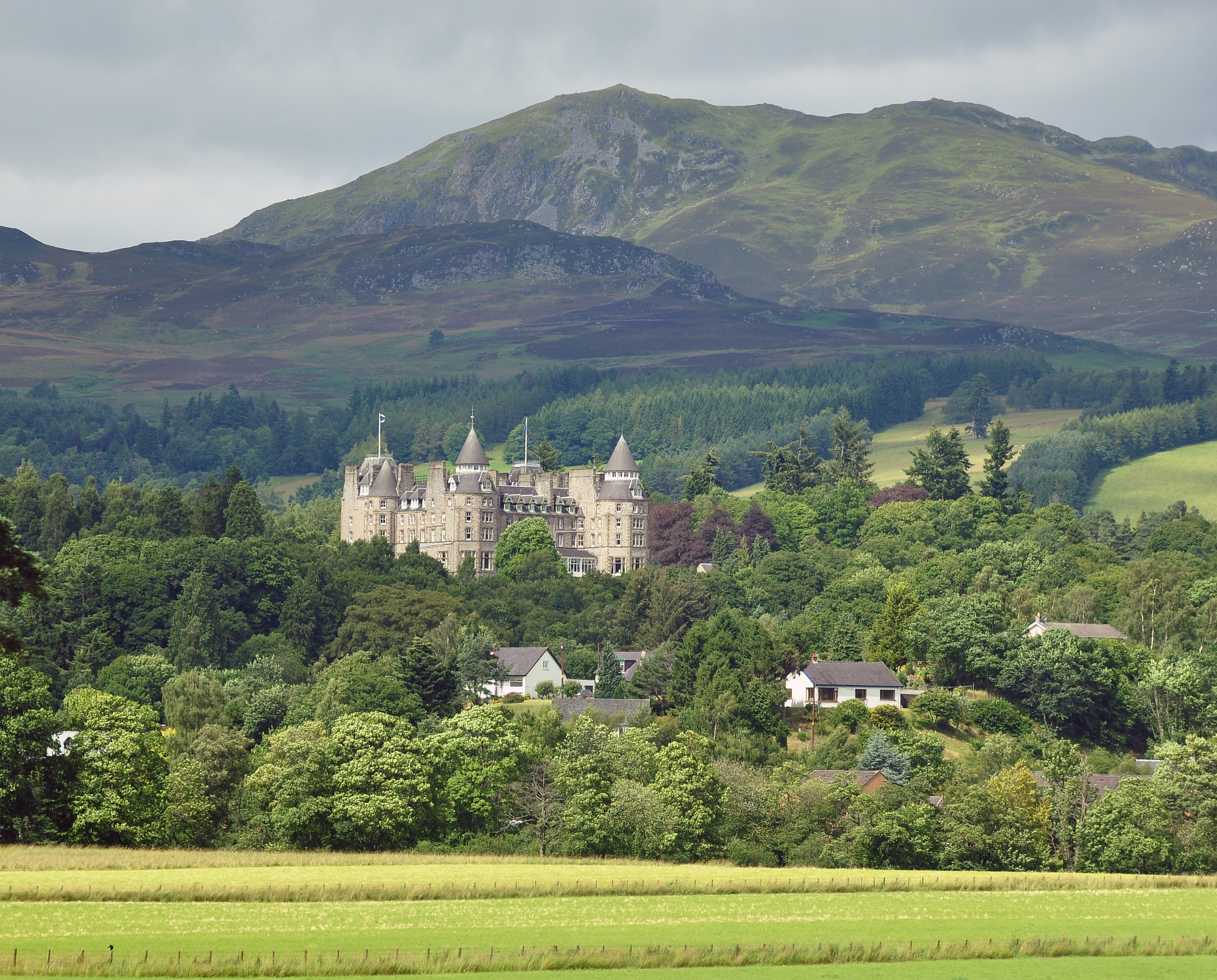
- Atholl Palace Hotel
- Interactive map of the Atholl Palace Hotel area

General information
- Location: Pitlochry, Scotland
- Coordinates: 56°42′5.5″N 3°43′11.6″W
- Construction started: 1875
- Completed: 1886

Design and construction
- Architect: Andrew Heiton

Listed Building – Category B
- Designated: 5 October 1971
- Reference no.: LB39856

Atholl Palace Hotel is a Category B listed building in Pitlochry, Scotland.

== History and architecture ==
In 1873, the 30-acre site was leased by the Balnakeilly Estate to the Athole Hydropathic Company. The company launched a share prospectus in September 1873 with the aim of raising £40,000 (equivalent to £3,760,000 in 2025) in 4,000 shares. The building was designed by Andrew Heiton (Junior).

Construction started in February 1876. The contractor for the masonry was Henry Robertson and Company. By 1883, the proprietor, Mr. Dick, was bankrupt, having spent £60,000 (equivalent to £6,310,000 in 2025). The site was sold to William McDonald, lessee of the Royal Refreshment Rooms at Perth General Railway Station, for £25,000 and it opened on 25 June 1886.

The hotel was sold in 1911 and again in 1913 to the Atholl Palace Hotel (Pitlochry) Company when it took on its current name. During the First World War it became the home of Queen Margaret Girls’ School, Scarborough (now moved to York) when their school was damaged during the bombardment of 1914 and during the Second World War hosted The Leys School from Cambridge.

During the 1930s the hotel built a suite of accommodation near the garages for chauffeurs. This was designed by the architect John Steel.

In 1971 the hotel was purchased by the Clydesdale Commonwealth Hotels along with the lease for the adjoining golf course for £130,000. The group planned an extensive renovation and expansion of the hotel with the addition of a conference suit to accommodate 500 delegates and most of the 130 bedrooms were to be equipped with private bathrooms. A further 100 twin rooms were to be added.
