= St Martin-in-the-Fields (painting) =

Painting by William Logsdail

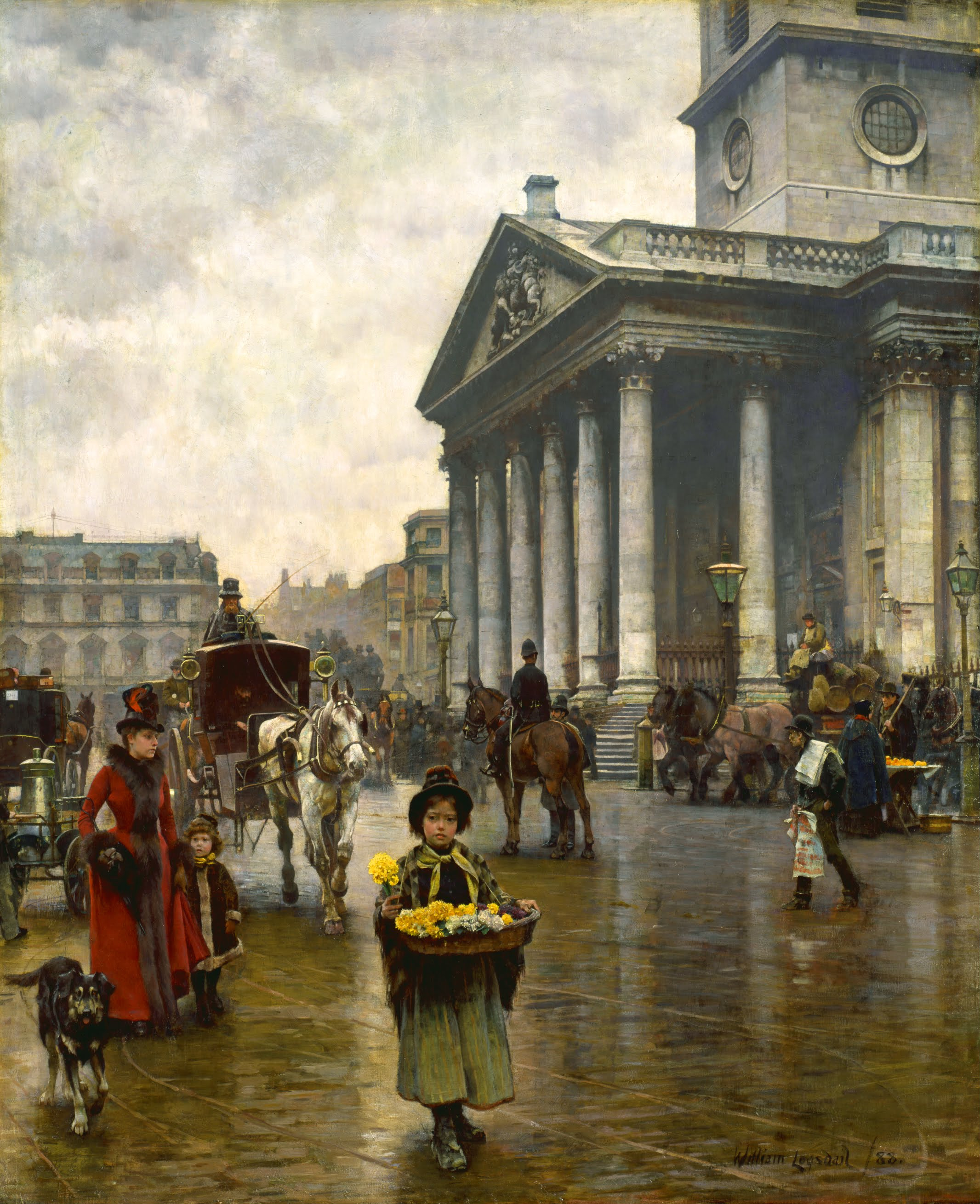
- Artist: William Logsdail
- Year: 1888
- Medium: Oil on canvas
- Dimensions: 143.5 cm × 118.1 cm (56.5 in × 46.5 in)
- Location: Tate Britain; London

St Martin-in-the-Fields is an oil on canvas painting by William Logsdail, from 1888. It depicts a child street vendor outside the church of St Martin-in-the-Fields in Trafalgar Square, London. It is in the collection of Tate Britain.

An engraving from the painting was published in The Graphic, in 1894.
