= Queen Margaret's School, York =

Location
- Escrick Park; York, North Yorkshire, YO19 6EU; England; 53.87291°N 1.04040°W

Information
- Type: Private boarding school and day school
- Motto: Filia Regis (Daughter of the King)
- Religious affiliation: Church of England
- Established: 1901
- Founder: Woodard Foundation
- Closed: 2025
- Department for Education URN: 121749 Tables
- Chairman of the Board of Governors: Terry Burt
- Head: Nicola Dudley
- Chaplain: Robert Owen
- Gender: Girls
- Age: 11 to 18
- Enrolment: 215
- Houses: 6
- Former pupils: Old Margaretians

Queen Margaret's School was an independent boarding and day school for girls aged 11–18 set in 75 acres of parkland, six miles south of York. It was established in 1901 and closed 125 years later in 2025.

== History ==
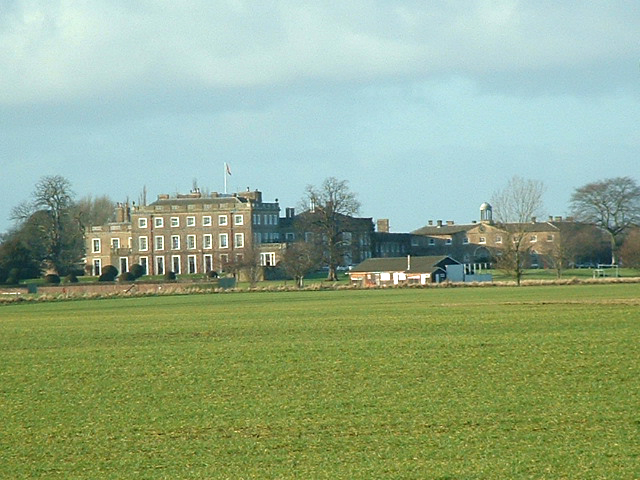
Queen Margaret's School

Queen Margaret's was established in 1901 in Scarborough mainly by Jane Leeke Latham of the Woodard Foundation. Woodard are an organisation committed to the establishment of boarding schools where teaching would be firmly based on the Christian religion. The founding head was Agnes Body who arrived from Lincoln with some of her former staff. In 1913, when ill health made her retire, it was said that QM was known as "Miss Body's School".

Rosalind Fowler became the second Head and she supervised the evacuation of the School to the Atholl Palace Hotel, Pitlochry during the First World War. Following another evacuation to Castle Howard in the Second World War, QM finally came to Escrick Park, six miles south of York, in 1949, where it remained until closure. Mrs Sue Baillie commenced her headship in September 2019, taking over from the previous Head Mrs Jessica Miles.

On 13 June 2025, it was announced that the school would close due to financial pressures on 5 July that year.

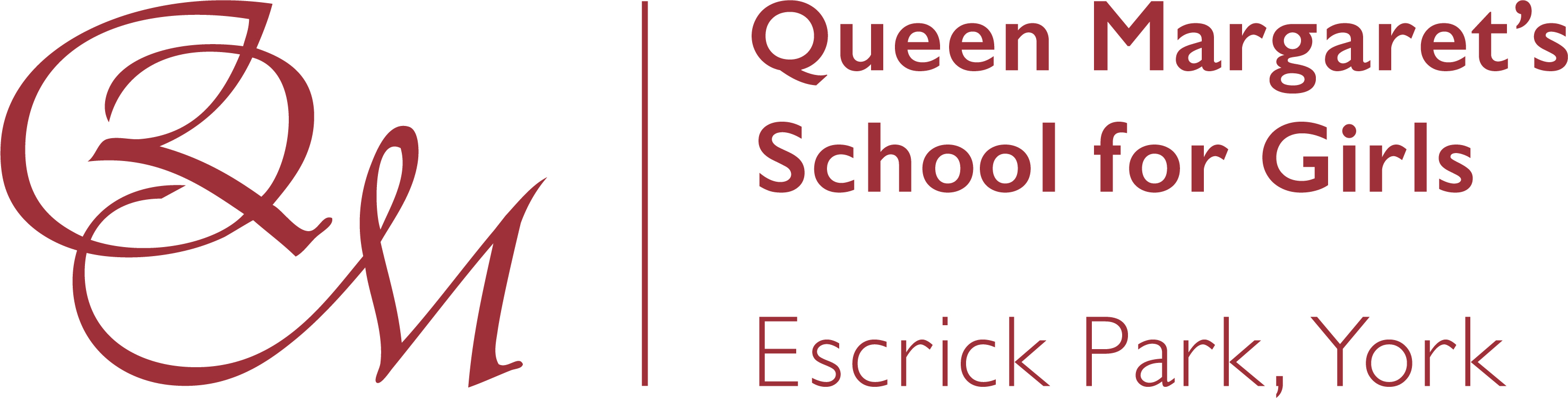
Queen Margaret's School for Girls Logo

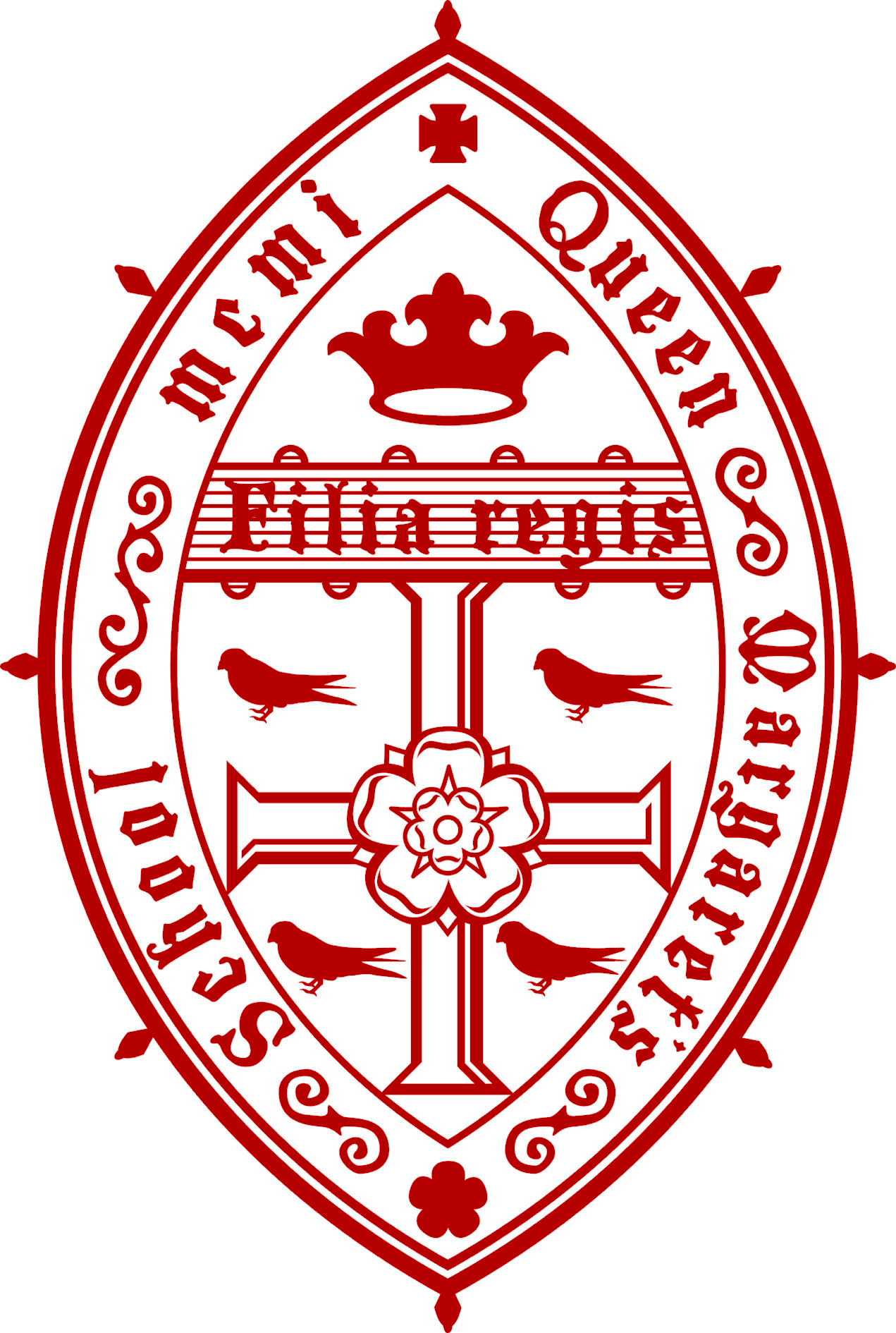
Queen Margaret's School Crest

It was sold to Escrick Holdings Ltd in 2026.

== Exam results ==
The pass rate at A Level in 2021 was 100% and 47% of all grades were at A*, with 78% at A*-A (nationally that figure was 44%).

The pass rate at GCSE in 2021 was 100%. One third (33%) of all GCSE results were at grade 9 and two thirds (67%) were at grades 9–7.

== Inspection ==
A 2019 inspection by the Independent Schools Inspectorate awarded Queen Margaret's its highest 'Excellent' rating across all categories inspected.

== Dance ==
The School offered lessons in ballet, tap, hip-hop, contemporary and modern dance.

== Sport ==
Sports facilities included an all-weather Astroturf, a sports hall, a competition-standard indoor swimming pool and a recreational outdoor pool, all-weather tennis courts, indoor squash courts, and a riding school adjacent to the main school campus. Main winter activities included: lacrosse, cross country, hockey, and netball. Summer sports included: athletics, cricket and rounders. Badminton, tennis, and squash were played.

== Houses ==
Queen Margaret's had horizontal boarding houses for boarding, and vertical houses across all ages.

There were six vertical houses: Garry, Pitlochry, Duncan, QM Hall, School and St Aidan's. Each pupil and teacher was assigned to one of the houses and each house was run by a teacher as Head of House; two Upper Sixth girls were chosen to be House Captain and Deputy House Captain, and two or three Fourth Year (Year 10) girls were chosen as House Monitors. Inter-house competitions included those for sport, cookery and music.

== Boarding ==
Around 80% of pupils were boarders. They were assigned to a boarding house based on year group and age. Each boarding house was supervised by a housemaster or housemistress who was assisted by the Head of Year.

- Warwick House (Years 7–9, QM's Years I-III)
- Winifred Holtby House, also known as "Winnie's" (Years 10–11, QM's Year IV-V)
- Cloisters (Year 12, QM's LVI Lower Sixth)
- The Cottages (Year 13, QM's UVI Upper Sixth)

== Notable former pupils ==
See also Category:People educated at Queen Margaret's School, York

- Druie Bowett, artist
- Sarah Connolly, opera Singer
- Joan Hall, politician
- Winifred Holtby, novelist and journalist
- Ann Jellicoe, actor, theatre director and playwright
- Katharine, Duchess of Kent
- Dame Eleanor King, High Court Judge
- Matilda Lowther, fashion model
- Lady Alice Manners, fashion columnist
- Lady Eliza Manners, socialite
- Lady Violet Manners, fashion model
- Suraya Marshall, Air Officer Commanding of No. 2 Group RAF
- Elizabeth Poston, Composer
- Amanda Staveley, businesswoman

== Heads ==
The Heads of Queen Margaret's were as follows:

- Agnes Body (1901–1913)
- Rosalind Fowler (1913–1928)
- Mildred Burella-Taylor (1928–1934)
- Lily Parsons (1934–1938)
- Joyce Brown (1938–1960)
- Barbara Snape (1960–1980)
- Pat Valentine (1980–1983)
- Colin McGarrigle (1983–1992)
- Geoffrey Chapman (1993–2009)
- Paul Silverwood (2009–2014)
- Carole Cameron, Acting Head (2014–2015)
- Jessica Miles (2015–2019)
- Sue Baillie (2019–2024)
- Nicola Dudley (2024–2025)

== Arms ==
Coat of arms of Queen Margaret's School, York

Crest
On a wreath Or Gules Azure Argent Aules and Azure out of a chaplet of roses Argent barbed and seeded Proper a demi lion rampant Gules gorged with a collar gemel flory counterflory Or supporting a key in bend Gold.
Escutcheon
Azure on a cross formy between four crested tits Or a rose Argent barbed and seeded Proper on a chief Ermine an ancient crown Gold.
Motto
Filia Regis

== See also ==
- Grade II* listed buildings in North Yorkshire (district)
- Listed buildings in Escrick
