= Listed buildings in Escrick =

Escrick is a civil parish in the county of North Yorkshire, England. It contains 18 listed buildings that are recorded in the National Heritage List for England. Of these, three are listed at Grade II*, the middle of the three grades, and the others are at Grade II, the lowest grade. The parish contains the village of Escrick and the surrounding area. The most important building in the parish is Escrick Park, a country house converted into a school. This is listed, and most of the other listed buildings are structures associated with it, in its gardens or the surrounding park. The rest of the listed buildings are in the village, and consist of a church, a vicarage converted into a hotel, and a memorial fountain.

== Key ==
Grade	Criteria
II*	Particularly important buildings of more than special interest
II	Buildings of national importance and special interest

== Buildings ==
Name and location	Photograph	Date	Notes	Grade
Escrick Park; 53.87287°N 1.04026°W		c. 1680–90	A country house that was altered in 1758, extended in about 1765 by John Carr, and later converted into Queen Margaret's School. The building is rendered with stone dressings, the Carr extension is in brick, and it has a hipped Welsh slate roof. The main block has three storeys and seven bays, flanked by single-storey single-bay extensions, and with two-storey rear wings, the right with three bays and the left with four bays. The entrance on the right has a portico with four Ionic columns, a frieze, a cornice and a balustrade. The main range has floor bands, a moulded modillion cornice, a frieze, and a balustrade with urns on the corners. The windows in the ground floor are casements, above are sash windows, and all have architraves. In the Carr range are canted bay windows.	II*
Piers and gate north of Escrick Park; 53.87411°N 1.04171°W	—	Early 18th century (probable)	The piers are in pinkish-orange brick with stone dressings. They are square and about 3 metres (9.8 ft) high, and each pier has a stone cornice and a pineapple finial. The gate is in wrought iron, and has a rail and ornamental scrollwork between twisted bars.	II
Gate piers, Escrick Park; 53.84116°N 1.04995°W		Mid 18th century (probable)	The gate piers are in magnesian limestone, they have a square plan, and are about 2.5 metres (8 ft 2 in) high. The piers are rusticated, and each is surmounted by a moulded cornice, a frieze and a ball finial.	II
Garden Temple; 53.86238°N 1.03374°W		Mid to late 18th century	The garden temple in Escrick Park Gardens is in stone and has a circular plan. Two steps lead up to an Ionic colonnade, with a frieze, a cornice, and a stepped blocking course. At the rear are pilasters.	II
Former coach house and stables, Escrick Park; 53.87348°N 1.04024°W	—	c. 1775	The coach house and stable block were designed by John Carr, and are in brick with stone dressings, rendered on the front, and with a Welsh slate roof. There are four ranges with a square plan around an open courtyard. The south range has two storeys, and nine bays projecting slightly under a dentilled pediment containing a clock. The range has a plinth, a continuous impost band, a dentilled cornice and a hipped roof. On the front are three recessed arched with moulded heads, and sash windows. On the roof is a cupola with Doric columns and a domed lead roof. The other ranges have a single storey.	II*
Wheldrake Lodge; 53.87559°N 1.03284°W	—	Early 19th century	The estate lodge, which incorporates medieval fragments, is in magnesian limestone with a tile roof. There are two storeys and three bays, the right bay recessed. The middle bay is gabled with decorative bargeboards, and contains an oriel window with a hood mould, above which are five re-set medieval corbel stones, and in the left bay is a casement window. The entrance is at the rear.	II
Garden urn six metres south of Escrick Park; 53.87274°N 1.04015°W	—	Early to mid 19th century	The garden urn is in artificial stone with a cast iron rim, and is about 1.5 metres (4 ft 11 in) high. It has a square plinth with a moulded base and cornice. The urn is shallow and has a fluted stem and an egg and dart motif to the rim.	II
Garden urn twelve metres south of Escrick Park; 53.87247°N 1.04004°W	—	Early to mid 19th century	The garden urn is in artificial stone, and stands on a square plinth about 1.75 metres (5 ft 9 in) high, decorated with a laurel wreath. On the urn are raised vine motifs, the stems of which form the handles.	II
Group of garden urns south of Escrick Park; 53.87270°N 1.03978°W	—	Early to mid 19th century	The three garden urns are in cast iron on square stone plinths, and are about 1.25 metres (4 ft 1 in) high. The urns have fluted stems, gadrooned bases, and fluted sides with egg and dart motifs to the rims.	II
Urn in courtyard of Escrick Park; 53.87306°N 1.04071°W	—	Early to mid 19th century	The urn is in Doulton Lambethware on a stone plinth, and is about 1.75 metres (5 ft 9 in) high. The plinth is circular and has dolphins at its base. The urn is decorated with the faces of eminent men, and has branchwork handlers and beading to the rim.	II
Headmaster's House; 53.87153°N 1.04251°W	—	Early to mid 19th century	An estate cottage in pinkish-brown brick with a floor band and a hipped tile roof. There are two storeys, three bays, and single-storey single-bay ranges in front and to the rear. Most of the windows are tripartite horizontally-sliding sashes, and the others are tripartite and mullioned with segmental heads.	II
The Parsonage Country House Hotel; 53.87925°N 1.04579°W		1848–49	The vicarage, later a hotel, was designed by Francis Penrose, and is in pinkish-brown and gault brick on a plinth with moulded stone coping, quoins, a floor band, and a Welsh slate roof. There are two storeys and six bays, the middle four bays gabled with decorative weatherboarding. The doorway has a moulded surround and a Tudor arched head, above which is an oriel window. The other windows either have a single light, or are mullioned with quoined surrounds, some with hood moulds. On the garden front are two canted bay windows.	II
Pair of garden urns southwest of Escrick Park; 53.87252°N 1.04105°W	—	19th century	The garden urns are in artificial stone and about 1 metre (3 ft 3 in) high. Each has a square plinth, and an urn ornamented with festoons.	II
Gates, piers and railings, Wheldrake Lodge; 53.87571°N 1.03288°W	—	Mid 19th century	The gates are in cast iron, and have three levels of rails and bars, and dog bars surmounted by ornate lance heads. They are flanked by stone piers in the form of columns, with ball finials. Outside these are railings in a crescent shape, with circular and cross motifs, ending in tapering piers with ball finials.	II
St Helen's Church, Escrick; 53.88055°N 1.04601°W		1856–57	The church was designed by Francis Penrose and restored in 1925 following a fire. It is built in sandstone with a tile roof, and consists of a nave, a north aisle and vestry, a west baptistry with an eight-sided apse, a south porch, an apsidal chancel and a northeast tower. The tower has five stages, buttresses rising to pinnacles, an east doorway with a pointed arch and a chamfered surround, a semicircular bell turret, a five-light arcade in the third stage, clock faces, twin two-light bell openings, and an embattled parapet with corner pinnacles. The porch has two storeys, a pointed doorway, diagonal buttresses, an embattled parapet with gargoyles, and at the rear is an octagonal stair turret with a spirelet.	II*
Sundial west of Escrick Park; 53.87274°N 1.04055°W	—	Late 19th century (probable)	The sundial is in artificial stone and about 1.25 metres (4 ft 1 in) high. It consists of a fluted columnar pedestal, above which are three putti around an urn-shaped base. On the top is a brass gnomon.	II
Jubilee Fountain; 53.87845°N 1.04453°W	—	1897	The fountain, commemorating the Diamond Jubilee of Queen Victoria, is in stone, and has a stepped plinth, octagonal then circular. On this is a gadrooned urn with an upturned scallop shell. On the top is a feature consisting of three dolphin-like fish with intertwined tails. Around the rim is an inscription.	II
Gates and railings north of Escrick Park; 53.87494°N 1.04127°W	—	1907	The ornamental gates and railings are in cast iron, they extend for about 6 metres (20 ft), and are 2 metres (6 ft 7 in) high. The railings have three levels of rails, with some ornamentation, bars between them, and scrollwork on the top. In the centre are double gates between decorative piers, and outside are pedestrian gates.	II
