= The Piazza of Saint Mark's, Venice =

Painting by William Logsdail

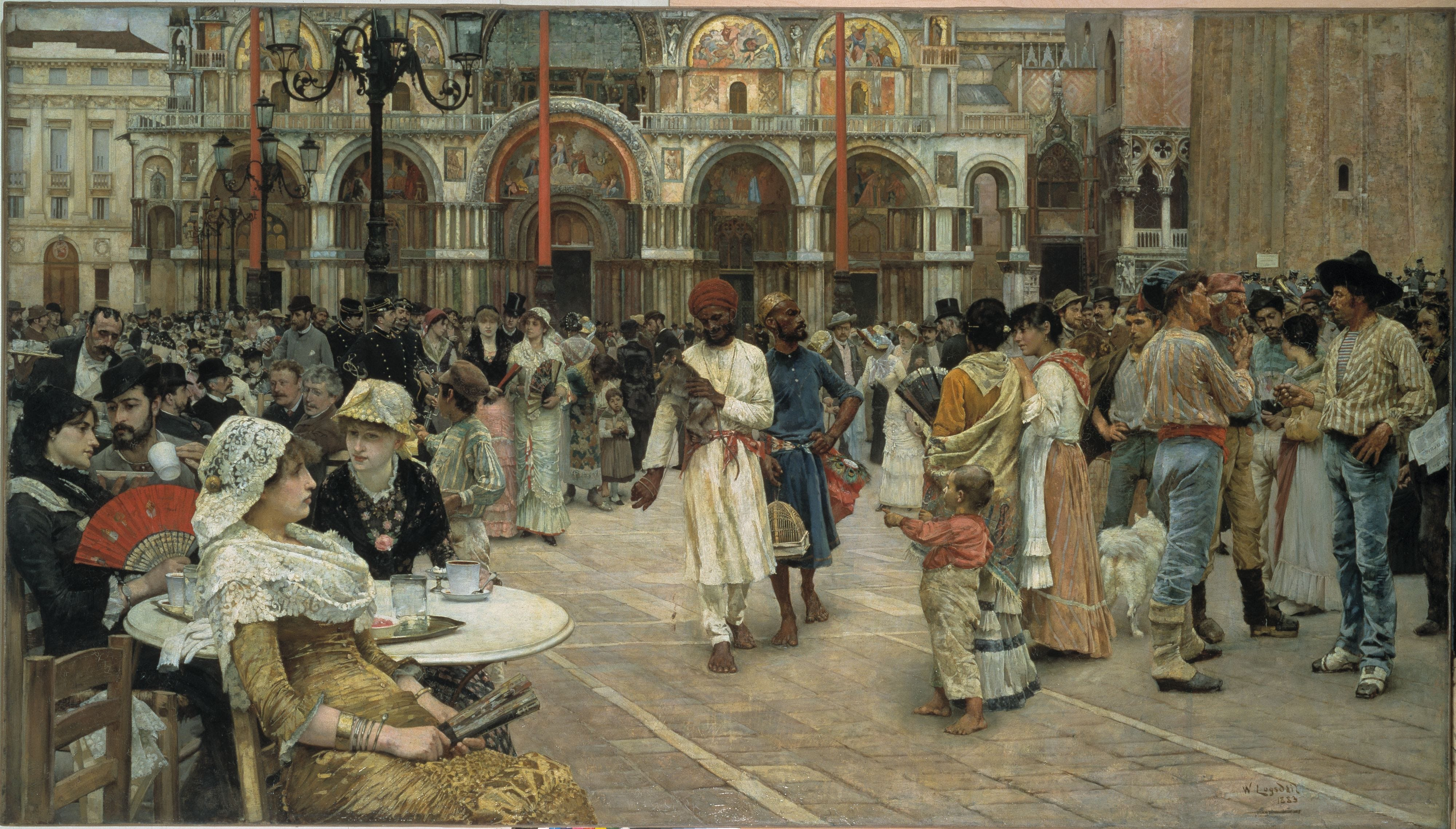
- Artist: William Logsdail
- Year: 1883
- Type: Oil on canvas, cityscape painting
- Dimensions: 126.2 cm × 222.3 cm (49.7 in × 87.5 in)
- Location: Birmingham Museum and Art Gallery, Birmingham

The Piazza of Saint Mark's, Venice is an 1883 oil painting by the British artist William Logsdail. It depicts the bustling Piazza San Marco in front of the Doge's Palace and famous basilica. It combines the artist's interest in architecture and realism. The two figures at the front, one of them carrying a monkey, were Lascar sailors on a P&O ship who he got to model for the picture.

The Lincoln-born Logsdail lived in Venice between 1880 and 1887 and again from 1892 to 1900. On his arrival he encountered James McNeill Whistler, although he resisted becoming an artistic follower of him and forged his own distinct style. The work was displayed ay the Royal Academy Exhibition of 1883 held at Burlington House in London, where it was considered as the "picture of the year". Today the painting is part of the collection of Birmingham Museum and Art Gallery, which acquired it in 1898.

== Bibliography ==
- Grieve, Alastair. Whistler's Venice. Yale University Press, 2000.
- Hammerschlag, Keren Rosa. The Chosen Race: Troubling Whiteness in Victorian Painting. University of California Press, 2026.
- Lambourne, Michael. Victorian Painting. Phaidon, 1999.
