= St Helen's Church, Escrick =

Anglican church in North Yorkshire, England

Coordinates: 53°52′50″N 1°02′46″W

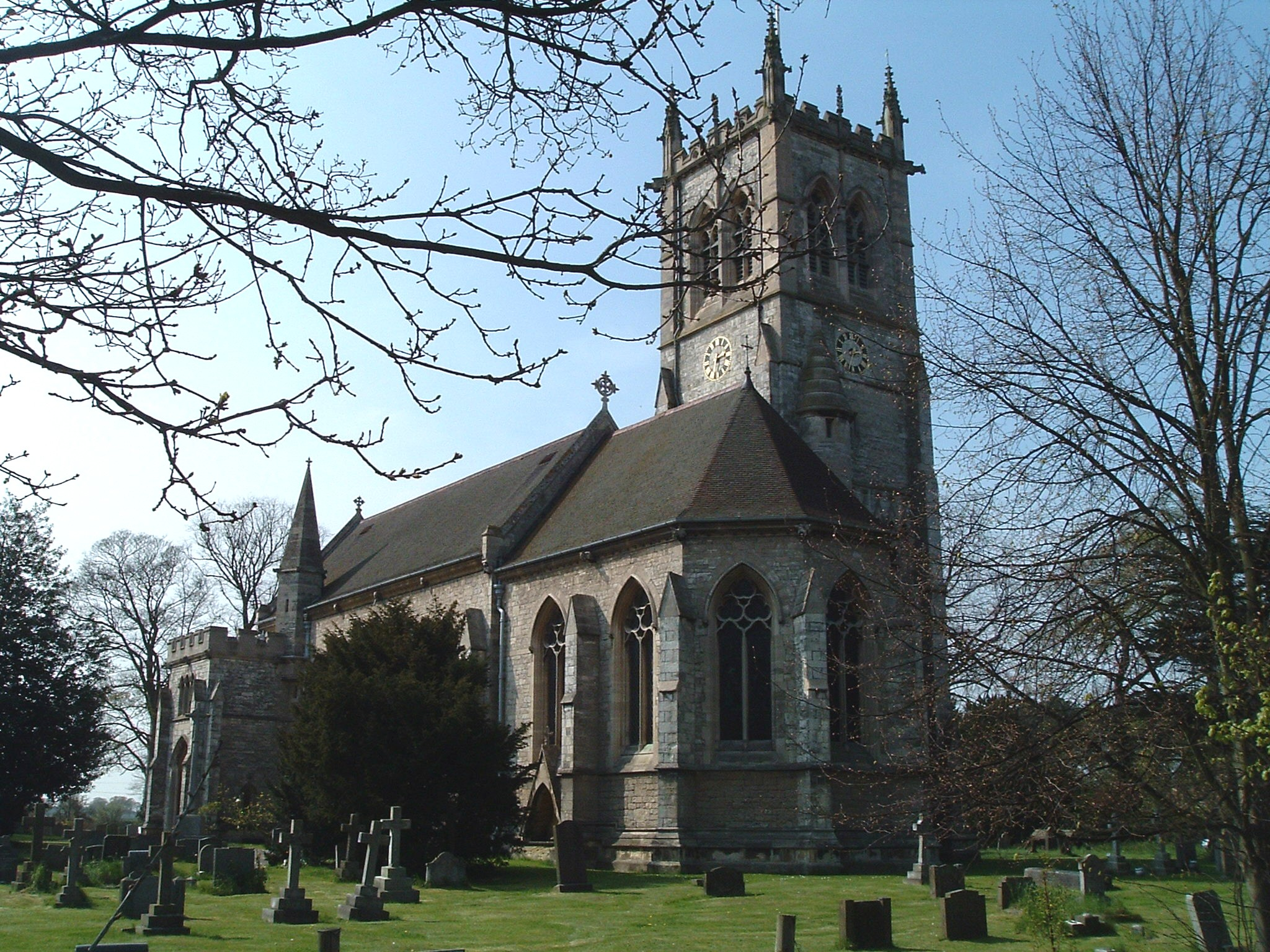
The church, seen from the south east, in 2006

St Helen's Church is the parish church of Escrick, a village south of York, in North Yorkshire, in England.

A church was first recorded in Escrick in 1252. Its tower was rebuilt or repaired in 1460, and the church was repaired in 1663. In 1759, the pulpit, reading desk and pews were replaced, and a gallery at the east end was replaced by one at the west end. However, in 1781, the site of the church was granted to Beilby Thompson to improve the area around Escrick Hall, on condition that he built a new church.

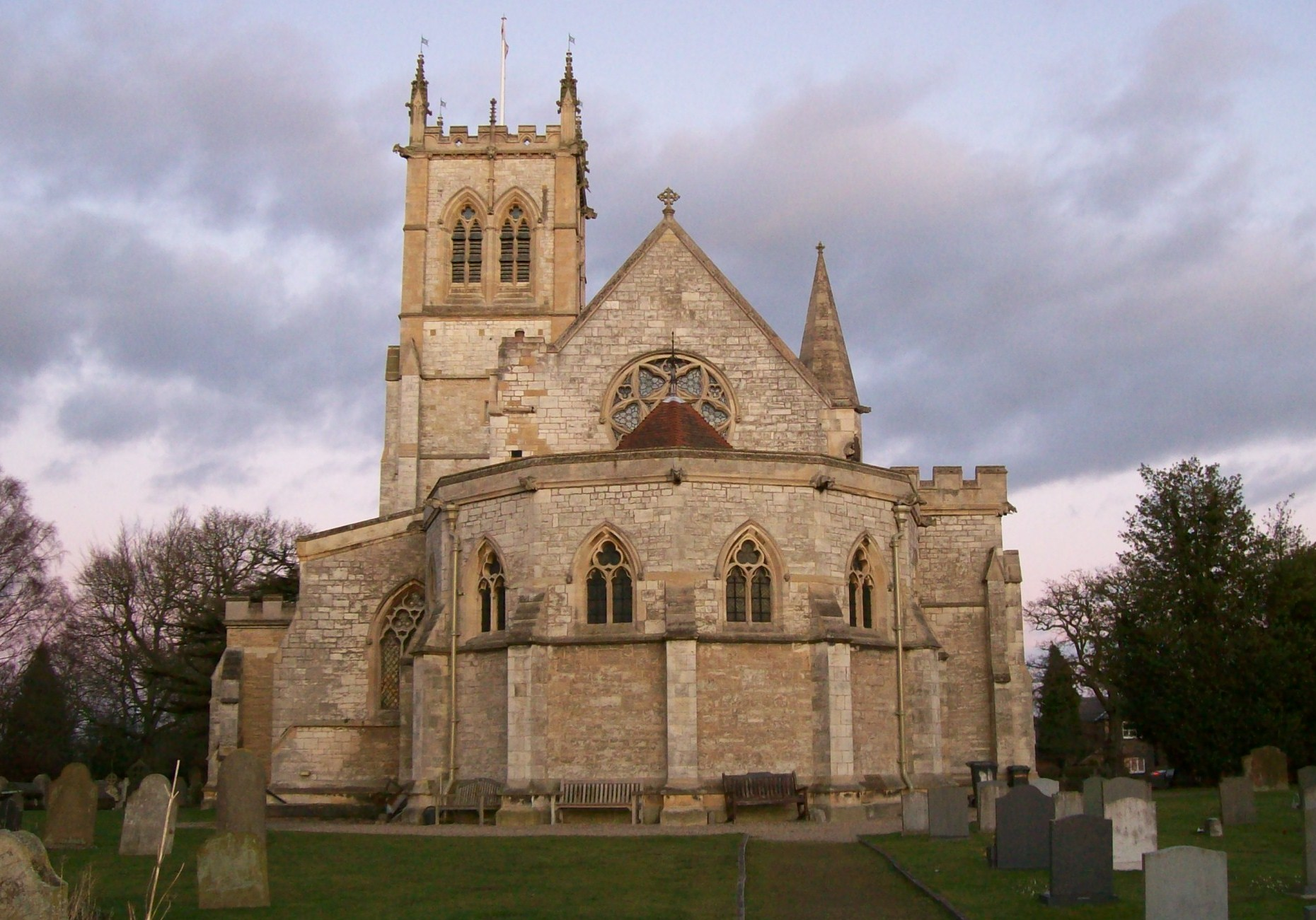
The west end of the church, in 2012

The second church was built on a new site, by the York to Selby road. It was a brick structure, in the classical style, and was consecrated in 1783. However, in 1857, it was replaced by the current church, a stone structure in the Perpendicular style, designed by Francis Penrose. The new structure cost £26,000 to build. The church survives today, with a vestry added in 1896. A fire in 1923 destroyed the furnishings, but the church was quickly restored by John Bilson, and reopened to worship in 1925. In 1966, the church was Grade II* listed.

The church has a five-bay nave with a north aisle, a two-bay chancel in the form of an apse, an eight-sided apse at the west end, containing a bapistery and chapel, over a crypt, and a tower to the north-east. There is also a south porch. The church is supported by buttresses and has battlements. Various gargoyles decorate the structure. The west apse contains an ogee-headed door to the crypt.

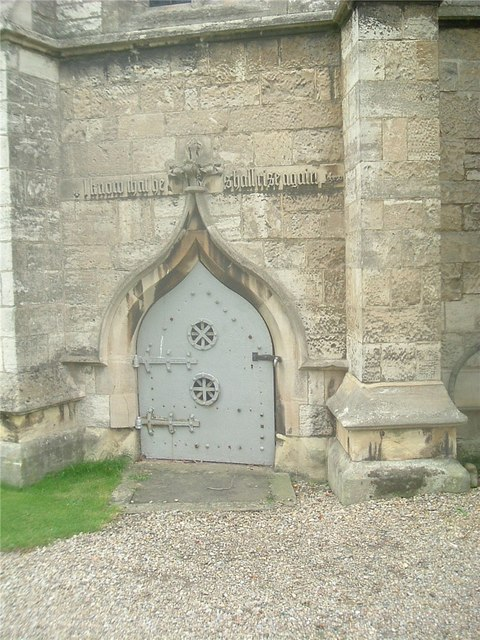
Doorway to the crypt

There are an assortment of Geometric windows in the church. Those behind the altar were designed by Bilson. There is an early 14th century monument to a knight, possibly Roger de Lascelles, which is now damaged. Among the wall monuments are one to Beilby Thompson, and one of about 1816 to Jane Lawley, carved by Bertel Thorvaldsen.

The church houses a peal of 12 bells:

Bell	Weight	Nominal Note	Diameter inches	Cast year	Founder Canons
1	6-3-7	F#	29.63"	1928	Mears & Stainbank
2	6-2-5	E	30.00"	1928	Mears & Stainbank
3	6-1-26	D#	30.38"	1928	Mears & Stainbank
4	6-2-7	C#	31.88"	1928	Mears & Stainbank
5	6-3-19	B	32.88"	1928	Mears & Stainbank
6	7-0-20	A#	33.75"	1928	Mears & Stainbank
7	7-3-26	G#	35.88"	1928	Mears & Stainbank
8	11-0-11	F#	39.50"	1928	Mears & Stainbank
9	16-1-23	E	45.00"	1975	John Taylor & Co
10	17-1-14	D#	46.25"	1928	Mears & Stainbank
11	23-3-24	C#	52.25"	1929	Mears & Stainbank
12	34-2-10	509.4B	59.00"	1929	Mears & Stainbank
0extra	6-3-1	G#		2000	Whitechapel Bell Foundry
6b	7-3-17	A	35.88"	1953	Mears & Stainbank

== See also ==
- Grade II* listed churches in North Yorkshire (district)
- Listed buildings in Escrick
