= Agnes Body =

- Born: 29 April 1866; Sedgley
- Died: 31 March 1952 (aged 85); Torquay
- Known for: 1st head of Queen Margaret's School, York & Lincoln Christ's Hospital Girls' High School

Agnes Body (29 April 1866 – 31 March 1952) was a British headmistress. She was the founding head of Lincoln Christ's Hospital Girls' High School and Queen Margaret's School, then in Scarborough.

== Life ==
Body was born in Sedgley in 1866 where her father was the curate. She was one of the seven children of Louisa Jane and George Body. In 1883 she was living in Durham with her family until in 1886 she went to Cheltenham Ladies College to train to become a teacher. She passed her exams and turned down an offer from Alice Ottley School to return to Cheltenham Ladies College to work under Dorothea Beale who convinced her that teaching was a "sacred mission".

In September 1893 Lincoln Christ's Hospital Girls' High School was started with Agnes Body as its headmistress.

Queen Margaret's School, York was established in Scarborough by the Woodard Foundation, an organisation committed to the establishment of Christian boarding schools. Body was the founding head and she arrived from Lincoln with some of her former staff. In 1913, when ill-health made her retire, it was said that QMS was known as "Miss Body's School". Rosalind Fowler became the second head.

Body moved from Bishops Stortford to Torquay in 1930 and she died there in 1952.
