= The Ninth of November, 1888 =

Painting by William Logsdail

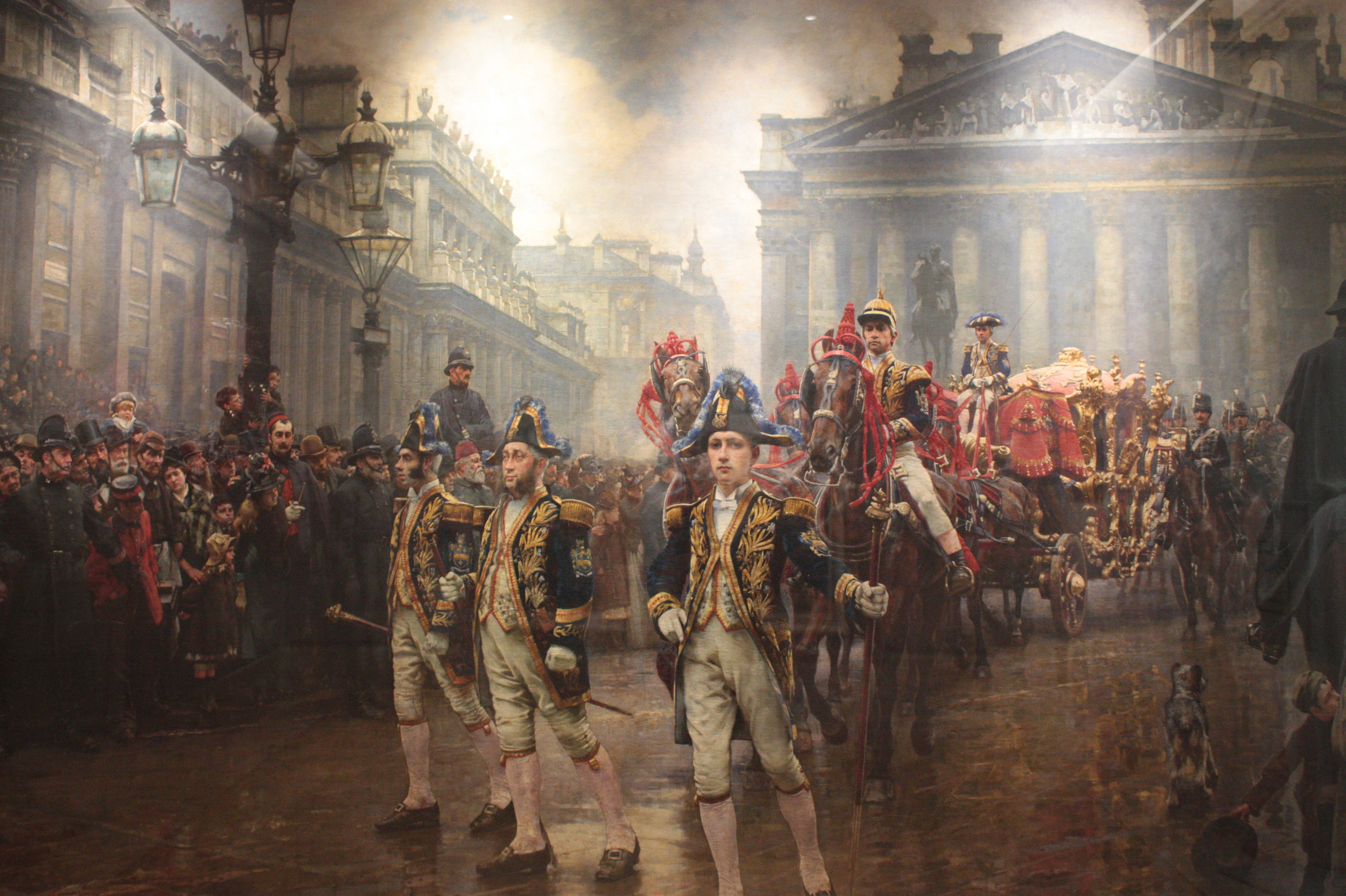
- Artist: William Logsdail
- Year: 1890
- Type: Oil on canvas, history painting
- Dimensions: 187 cm × 272 cm (74 in × 107 in)
- Location: Guildhall Art Gallery, London

The Ninth of November, 1888 is an 1890 oil painting by the British artist William Logsdail. It depicts the annual Lord Mayor's Procession passing by the Mansion House and Bank of England.

Today the painting is in the collection of the Guildhall Art Gallery in the City of London, having been purchased in 1933 from the artist.

== See also ==
St Paul's Cathedral with the Lord Mayor's Procession, 1836 painting by David Roberts

== Bibliography ==
- Bills, Mark & Knight, Vivien (ed.) William Powell Frith: Painting the Victorian Age. Yale University Press, 2006
- Roe, Sonia & Hardy, Pat. Oil Paintings in Public Ownership in the City of London. Public Catalogue Foundation, 2009.
- Wright, Christopher, Gordon, Catherine May & Smith, Mary Peskett. British and Irish Paintings in Public Collections: An Index of British and Irish Oil Paintings by Artists Born Before 1870 in Public and Institutional Collections in the United Kingdom and Ireland. Yale University Press, 2006.
