= William Logsdail =

English painter (1859–1944)

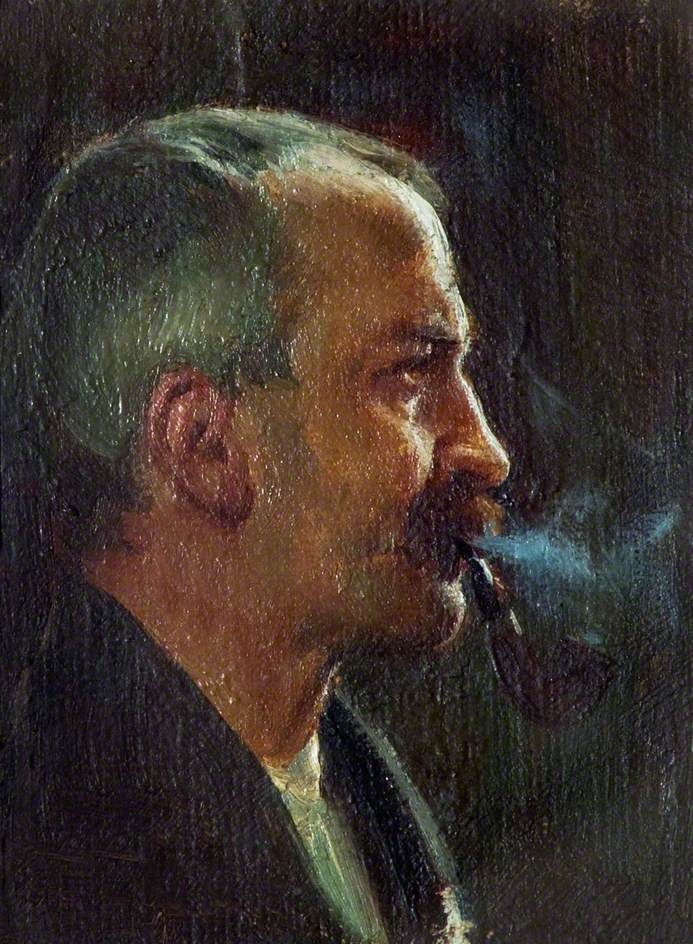
Self-Portrait of William Logsdail

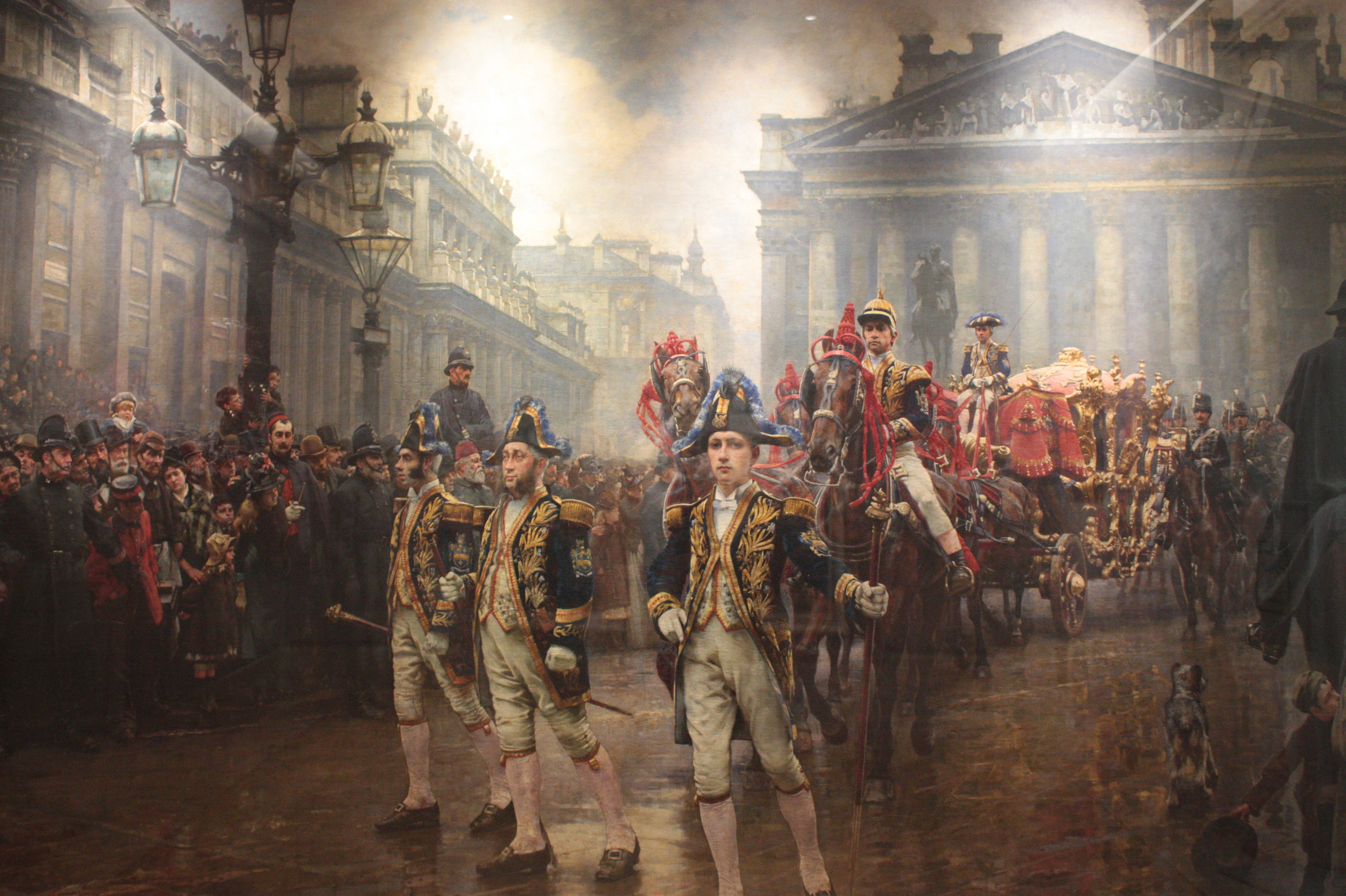
The Ninth of November, 1888 by William Logsdail, Guildhall Gallery, London

William Logsdail (25 May 1859 – 3 September 1944) was a prolific English landscape, portrait, and genre painter. He exhibited at the Royal Academy, the Royal Society of British Artists, the Grosvenor Gallery, the New Gallery (London), and others. He is notable for his realistic London and Venice scenes and his plein air style.

== Early life ==
He was born in the Close of Lincoln Cathedral, in Lincoln, England, May 1859. He was one of seven children, six boys and one girl. His father was a verger at the cathedral. As a boy, William attended Lincoln School (now Lincoln Christ's Hospital School), and also earned money by guiding visitors up the central tower of the cathedral.

== Training ==
Logsdail attended the Lincoln School of Art, where he initially showed an aptitude for architecture, but with the encouragement of his art master, Edward R. Taylor, (who was also Head of the School) he took to painting. While there, he won the Gold Medal for his work in competition with students at other English art schools. He went on to study in Antwerp, at the École des Beaux-Arts, under Charles Verlat. While there, he became the first Englishman to win first prize at the School. One of his works from this period, The Fish Market (1880), was bought on behalf of Queen Victoria for Osborne House., When told of this, Logsdail supposedly commented, 'Shows her Majesty's good sense'.

== Career ==
In the autumn of 1880, Logsdail visited Venice where he was to remain, with occasional visits to England, the Balkans, Egypt and the Middle East, until 1900. During this early period in his career, he gravitated towards architectural and subject paintings. His The Piazza of Saint Mark's, Venice, painted in 1883, was judged by the Royal Academy to be the 'picture of the year' when it was exhibited in London although he appears to have been dissatisfied by it, and seriously considered cutting the painting up during its composition.

He also painted some sixty-nine small paintings for the Fine Art Society on the subject of the French and Italian Riviera. Seven of these were sold to the Duke of Westminster. In 1893, Logsdail was awarded a medal for oil painting at the World's Columbian Exposition (also known as the Chicago World's Fair).

After spending two years at Taormina in Sicily, he and his family returned to England, settling in West Kensington, London, where his The Early Victorian (1906) (a costume portrait of his daughter Mary) was well received. This marked the beginning of a period of portrait painting for Logsdail, who was offered so many commissions that he was able to pick and choose his sitter at will.

In 1912, he was elected as a member of the Royal Society of Portrait Painters. As his career progressed, he turned to flower studies.

== Personal life and death ==
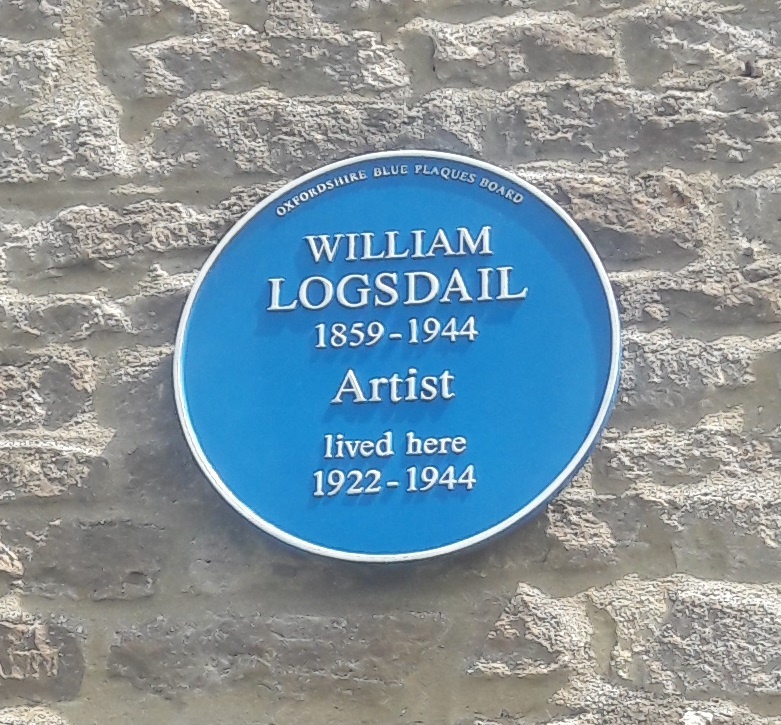
William Logsdail Oxfordshire Blue Plaque, Noke, Oxfordshire

In 1892, Logsdail met May Ashman of Necton, near Swaffham in Norfolk, marrying her in the same year. He had three children with her

In 1922, he and his family moved to the Manor House at Noke, near Islip, Oxfordshire, where Logsdail remained until his death at the age 85. A plaque on the house commemorates his time there.

== Relations with other painters ==
Logsdail was a friend of Frank Bramley, who also attended Lincoln School of Art and went on to co-found the Newlyn School and be elected to the Royal Academy.

While Logsdail was still studying, the art critic John Ruskin saw his painting of Lincoln Cathedral's south porch and expressed a favourable opinion of the work, later writing to him and suggesting that he go to Verona once his studies had reached a conclusion, advice the young artist ignored.

While in Venice, Logsdail moved in a social circle that included Harper Pennington, Robert Frederick Blum, Martin Rico y Ortega, Frank Duveneck, James McNeill Whistler and John Singer Sargent, the latter of whom inscribed a picture to Logsdail.

While not inclined to openly criticise other artists, Logsdail did, in his memoirs, relate a story concerning Walter Sickert. As he worked on his Ponte della Paglia (1898), Sickert arrived and set up his easel nearby. He then 'began to caper like a master of fence, backing and lunging with sudden stabs at his canvas'. An American passing by noticed a button on the pavement, retrieved it and, offering it to Sickert, said, 'Excuse me, sir, but I think this has worked loose!'.

== Style ==
Alms Houses, Antwerp, 1880

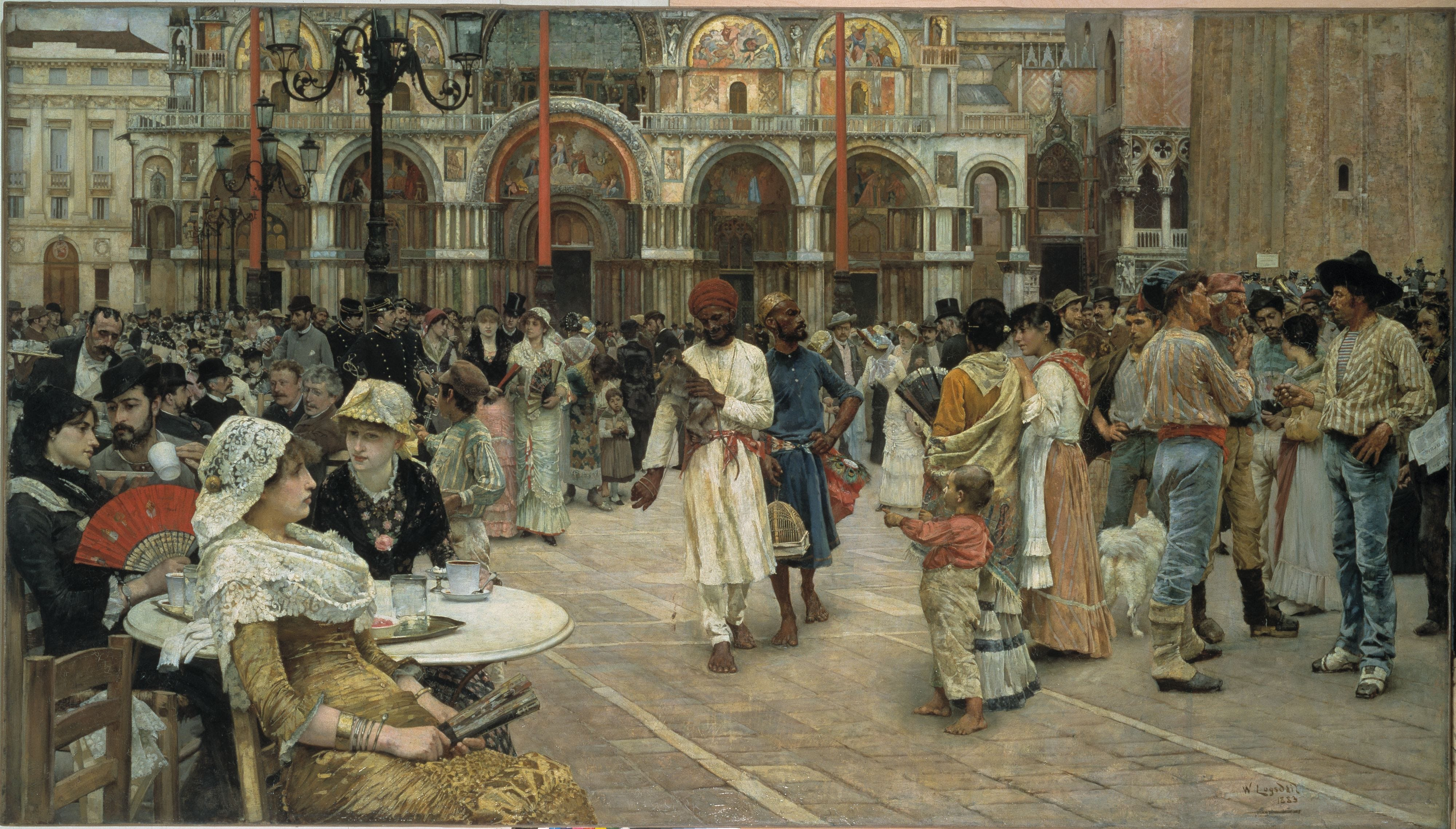
The Piazza of Saint Mark's, Venice, 1883

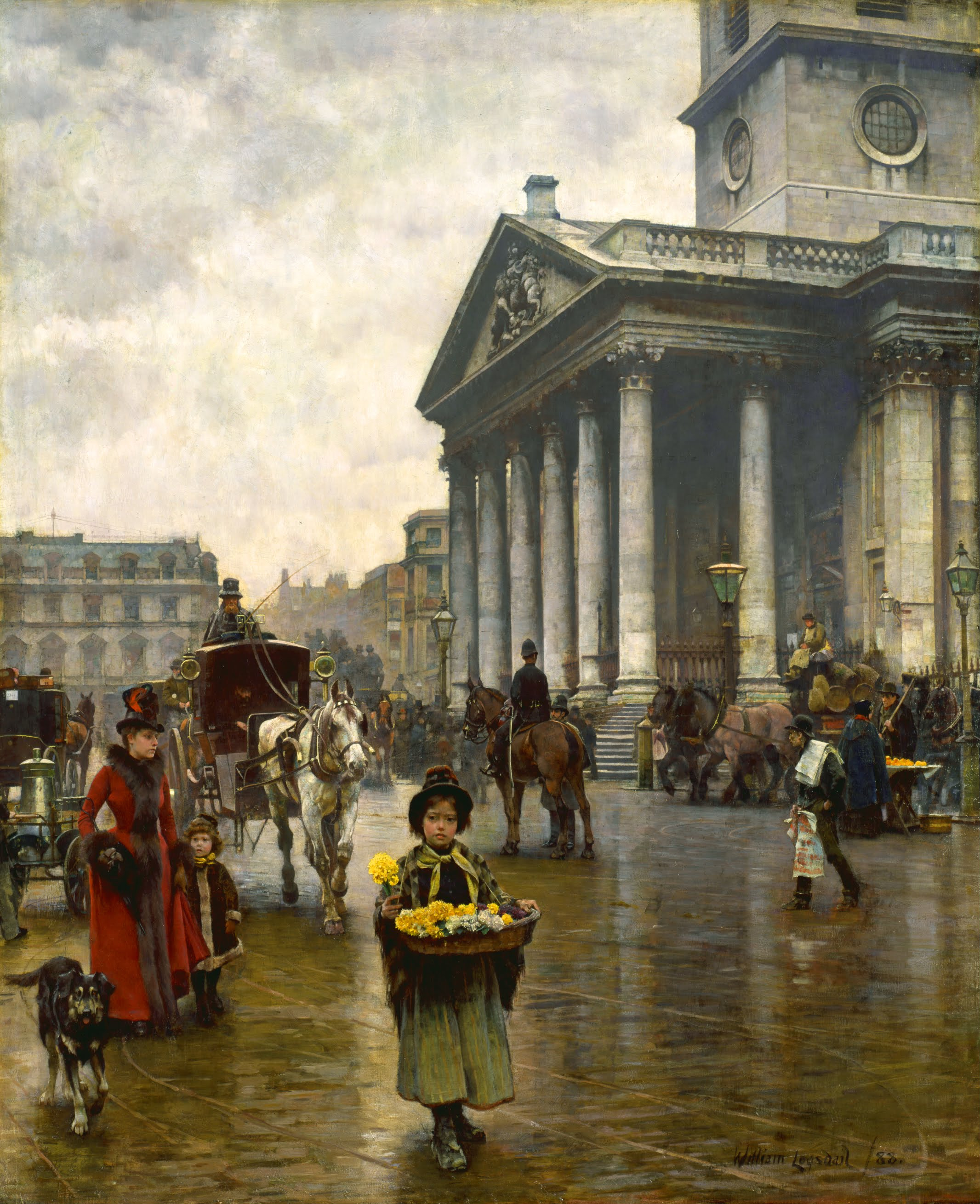
St. Martin's-in-the-Fields

Logsdail cultivated a tight objective and realistic style, although his later portraiture and the works painted while in Sicily demonstrate a relaxation of this style.

His Venice-based works exhibit a high degree of draughtsmanship described as beautiful and nearly photographic. There is a cool proficiency in his architectural work and street scenes that express what was actually there before him. For example, in the winter in which he came to paint his St. Martin's-in-the-Fields (1888), he hoped for a snow scene, but when faced with only rain and sleet, Logsdail, with his feet buried in straw to keep them warm, painted the scene without snow.

== Contemporary criticism ==
The Times, in its review of the Royal Academy's 1881 exhibition, called Logsdail's work technically almost faultless, resembling a first-rate mosaic, rather than possessing those qualities understood by artists as painting and lacking 'delicacy of gradation'. The Standard, in their review of the Royal Academy's 1883 exhibition described his The Piazza of St. Mark's, Venice as possessing a 'vivacity of characterisation' and a 'brilliancy of painting'.

In its review of London art exhibitions in 1887, The Times commented that his 'eastern' works, such as Arch of the Khalif – Cairo and Doorway of a Mosque, painted while in Egypt, were admirable and suited his talents as a colourist. Commenting on his The Ninth of November (The Lord Mayor's Procession, London, 1888) (1890), the Birmingham Daily Post pointed out its success in its accurate portrayal of the 'vigour, variety, humour, and incident of a London crowd'.

The Morning Post, in its review of the Royal Academy's 1897 exhibition, highlighted the 'sincerity' and 'judicious combination' of colour hues demonstrated in his Bronze Horses of St. Mark's, Venice (1897).

== Posthumous sales ==
The record auction price is for a picture of The Bank and the Royal Exchange which made £420,000 at Duke's auctions.

The Gates of Khalifa, Cairo realised £200,000 at Sotheby's in October 2019.

St. Martin-in-the-Fields achieved $214,200 in the sale of The Ann & Gordon Getty Collection at Christie's in New York in October 2022.

Bank and the Royal Exchange was offered with an estimate of £600,000 – £800,000 at Sotheby's in July 2010 but was unsold.

His portrait of his daughter "An Early Victorian" which launched his career as a portraitist made £30,000 at Christie's in 2011.

== Selected works ==
- The Fish Market (1880)
- Courtyard of the Plantin-Moretus House, Antwerp (1882)
- The Piazza of St. Mark's, Venice (1883)
- St. Martin's-in-the-Fields, Trafalgar Square, London (1888)
- The Ninth of November, 1888 (1890)
- A Street in Taormina (1901)
- Elisabeth, daughter of His Honour the late Judge Eustace Hills, KC (1907)
- Master Coleridge Hills, son of Judge Eustace & Nina Hills (1916)
- Portrait of T. Hampson Jones, Esq. (1916)
- Portrait of Stanley George Lutwyche, Master of the Leathersellers' Company 1906-07 (1912, Leathersellers' Hall)
