= George Body =

English canon of Durham

George Body (1840–1911) was an English canon who worked in Durham conducting mission work with the miners. He resisted the idea of women taking positions in the Anglican church.

== Early life and education ==
Body, born at Cheriton Fitzpaine, Devonshire, on 7 January 1840, was son of Josiah Body, surgeon, by his wife Mary Snell. He was educated at Blundell's School, Tiverton, from 1849 to 1857, and subsequently entered St. Augustine's Missionary College, Canterbury. But his intention of undertaking missionary work abroad had to be abandoned owing to ill-health. In 1859 he matriculated from St John's College, Cambridge University, and graduated B.A. in 1862, proceeding M.A. in 1876. Subsequently, he received from Durham University the degree of M.A. ad eundem (1884) and that of hon. D.D. (1885).

== Career as clergyman ==
Ordained deacon in 1863 and priest the following year, he served successively the curacies of St James, Wednesbury (1863–5), of Sedgeley (1865–7), and of Christ Church, Wolverhampton (1867–70). In these places he sought to bring the teaching of the tractarian movement home to the working classes and rapidly made a reputation as a mission preacher. Nominated rector of Kirby Misperton, Yorkshire, in 1870, he took an active part in the parochial mission movement. In 1883 he was appointed 'canon-missioner' of Durham by J. B. Lightfoot, bishop of the diocese, and for twenty-eight years carried on fruitful mission work among the Durham miners.

Lightfoot died unexpectedly in 1889 and he had encouraged Emily Marshall to develop her plans to develop the Bishop's idea of an Anglican female diaconate and of returning the idea of a Third Order of Saint Francis made up of men and women. Body invited Marshall and four others to be church workers as part of the League of St Cuthbert in 1891. Body took her idea and it became known as "Canon Body's Third Order". He forbade from her of talking about the order, but despite his plans, her idea of an order took off in Guiana and Barbados and Marshall was known as the founder.

Body's other activities covered a wide area. He was proctor in convocation for Cleveland from 1880 to 1885, and for Durham in 1906, vice-president of the Society for the Propagation of the Gospel (1890), and warden of the Community of the Epiphany, Truro (1891–1905). He collected large sums for mission work, and, according to biographer Gabriel Stanley Woods, his "sermons were remarkable for the directness and sincerity of their appeal". He was select preacher at Cambridge (1892-4-6 and 1900-4-6), and lecturer in pastoral theology at King's College, London, in 1909. Body also acted as examining chaplain to the bishop of St Andrews from 1893 to 1908.

Body combined evangelical fervour with tractarian principles. Although he was a member of the English Church Union, his sympathies were broad, and his conciliatory attitude during the church crisis concerning ritualism in 1898–9 exercised a moderating influence on the militant section of the high church party. In addition to many separate sermons, his published works were mainly devotional.

== Personal life and death ==
Body married Louisa, daughter of William Lewis, vicar of Sedgeley on 25 September 1864. Two portraits were made of Body: a miniature painted by Mrs. Boyd and a black-and-white drawing by Lady Jane Lindsey. He died at the College, Durham, on 5 June 1911. His wife survived him with three sons and four daughters, among them, headmistress Agnes Body. In 1911 a memorial fund was raised for the maintenance of the diocesan mission house and of a home of rest for mission workers among Durham miners.

== Bibliography ==
- The Life of Justification (1871; 6th ed. 1884)
- The Life of Temptation (1873; 6th ed. 1885)
- The Present State of the Departed (1873; 9th ed. 1888)
- The Appearances of the Risen Lord 1889.
- The School of Calvary (1891)
- The Guided Life (1893; new ed. 1899)
- The Life of Love (1893)
- The Work of Grace in Paradise (1896)
- The Soul's Pilgrimage (1901)
- The Good Shepherd (1910)

== Sources ==
This article incorporates text from a publication now in the public domain: Gabriel Stanley, Woods (1912). "Body, George". In Lee, Sidney (ed.). Dictionary of National Biography (2nd supplement). London: Smith, Elder & Co.
