= Garden Temple =

Temple and folly in Escrick, North Yorkshire, England

- Escrick Park Temple
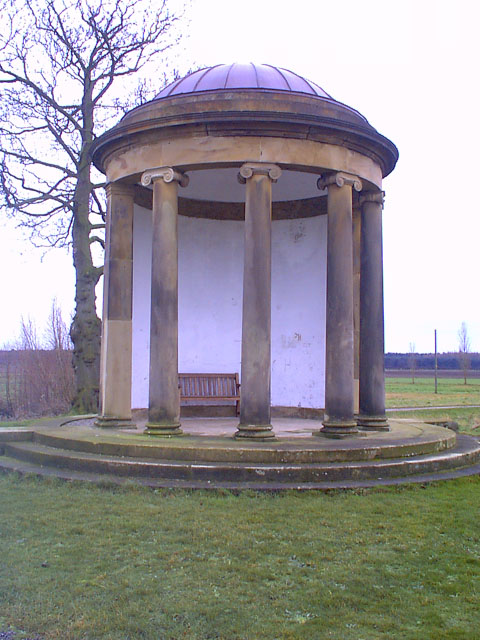
- Garden Temple, Escrick

- Location within North Yorkshire
- 53.86281°N 1.0337°W
- Location: Escrick, North Yorkshire, England
- Nearest city: York
- OS grid reference: SE 63647 41116

Garden Temple, also known as Escrick Park Temple, is a temple and folly in Escrick, North Yorkshire, England. The temple is listed as a grade II building under the Planning (Listed Buildings and Conservation Areas) Act 1990 because of its historical or architectural significance.

== History ==
The exact date of the building of the temple is not known, though it is thought to have been built as early as the mid 18th century and as late as the year of 1825.

== Architecture ==
The stone of which the circular temple is made from is ashlar and consists of two steps leading to the inside area of the temple, which is surrounded by two pilasters, four Ionic colonnades and a round wall, all topped off by a cornice with a roof above.

== See also ==
- Listed buildings in Escrick
