= Peter Day (broadcaster) =

British broadcaster (1947–2023)

Peter John Day
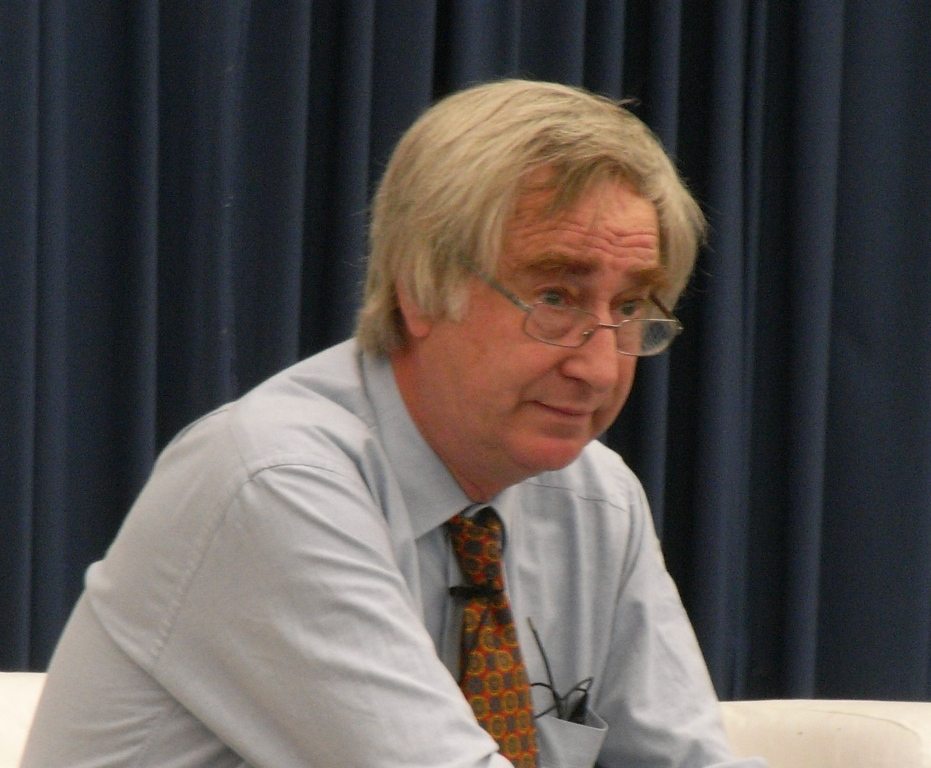
- Day in 2008
- Born: 17 February 1947; Thorpe St Andrew, Norfolk, England
- Died: 15 March 2023 (aged 76)
- Education: University of Oxford
- Occupations: Business correspondent for BBC Radio 4 and the BBC World Service
- Notable credits: BBC World Service; BBC Radio 4
- Website: www.bbc.co.uk/pressoffice/biographies/biogs/radio4/peter_day.shtml

Peter John Day (17 February 1947 – 15 March 2023) was a British broadcaster on BBC Radio 4 and the BBC World Service.

== Early life and education ==
His parents John Day and Lily Plummer married in 1939 in Norfolk.

Day was educated at Lincoln School, at the time a boys-only grammar school, from 1957 to 1964 as a boarder. His father was a manager with Midland Bank (which became HSBC in 1999) in Lincolnshire (Horncastle and Gainsborough). He has a younger brother, born in 1950 in Gainsborough.

Day studied English at St Edmund Hall, Oxford from October 1964, when only 17.

Day was trained on the International Publishing Corporation (Daily Mirror Group) newspaper training scheme in south Devon. He worked at the Daily Record from 1970 to 1974 in Glasgow.

== Career ==
Day joined BBC Radio News in 1974 in London, working on the business news in 1975.

In 1983, he left the BBC to join TV-am as their economics and industrial correspondent, appearing as a reporter on the first day of broadcast – 1 February 1983.

Day returned to the BBC to become a presenter and producer for the Financial World Tonight, which became part of The World Tonight.

Day presented In Business from 1988. On the World Service he presented its sister programme, Global Business, on weekends from 2000. He became Business Correspondent of the BBC in 1990, and in 1997 provided the business section for the Today programme.

On 1 September 2016 Peter Day presented his last ever In Business programme after 28 years. He wrote his last article for the BBC website on 26 May 2016.

== Personal life and death ==
Day died on 15 March 2023, at the age of 76.

== Awards ==
Day won the Harold Wincott Award for broadcast business journalism three times, in 1989, 2000 and 2002. He received the Work Foundation lifetime achievement award in 2006.
