= 1873 in art =

Events from the year 1873 in art.

== Events ==
- Early – Pre-Raphaelite painter Simeon Solomon is arrested in a public urinal in London and convicted and fined for gross indecency.
- 5 May
  - The Royal Academy Exhibition of 1873 opens at Burlington House in London
  - The Salon of 1873 opens at the Palace of Industry in Paris
- May – Vincent van Gogh is re-located to London by his employer, the art dealers Goupil & Cie.
- World exhibition in Vienna.
- Monet, Renoir, Pissarro, and Sisley organize the Société Anonyme Coopérative des Artistes Peintres, Sculpteurs, Graveurs, etc. for the purpose of exhibiting artworks independently.
- The collection forming the Galleria Nazionale dell'Umbria is moved to the Palazzo dei Priori, Perugia.
- New Accademia delle Arti del Disegno established in Florence.
- Leslie Ward, as "Spy", begins producing caricatures for the British magazine Vanity Fair.
- Michelangelo's statue of David is removed from the Piazza della Signoria in Florence to the Galleria dell'Accademia.

== Works ==
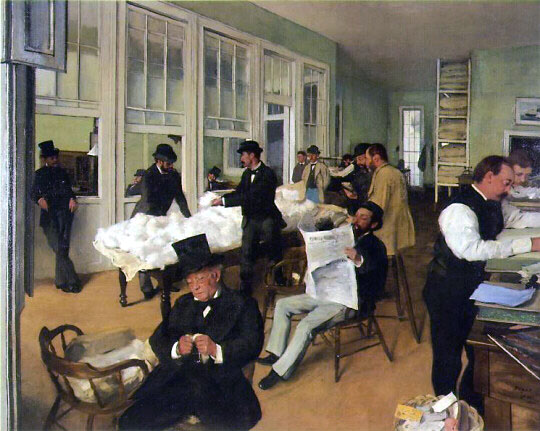
Degas – A Cotton Office in New Orleans

- William-Adolphe Bouguereau – Nymphs and Satyr
- John Brett – A North-West Gale off the Longships Lighthouse
- Edward Burne-Jones – Love Among the Ruins (original watercolour version)
- Alexandre Cabanel – La Comtesse de Keller
- Gustave Caillebotte – Nude woman lying on a couch
- Philip Hermogenes Calderon – Letter From Daddy
- Mary Cassatt – After the Bullfight
- Walter Crane – Shelley's Tomb in the Protestant Cemetery in Rome
- Alphonse-Marie-Adolphe de Neuville – The Last Cartridges (Les dernières cartouches)
- Edgar Degas – A Cotton Office in New Orleans
- Luke Fildes – Simpletons
- Jean-Léon Gérôme – Éminence Grise
- Hans Gude – Nødhavn Ved Norskekysten
- Winslow Homer – The Boat Builders
- William Holman Hunt – The Shadow of Death
- Rudolf Koller – Gotthardpost
- Ivan Kramskoi
  - Ivan Shishkin
  - Leo Tolstoy
- Edwin Long – The Moorish Proselytes of Archbishop Ximenes, Granada, 1500
- Édouard Manet
  - Le Bon Bock ("The Good Pint") (Philadelphia Museum of Art)
  - The Railway ("The Gare Saint-Lazare") (National Gallery of Art, Washington, D.C.)
- Jan Matejko – Astronomer Copernicus, or Conversations with God
- Pál Szinyei Merse – Picnic in May (National Gallery of Hungary, Budapest)
- John Everett Millais
  - Portrait of Effie Millais
  - Winter Fuel
- Claude Monet
  - The Artist's House at Argenteuil
  - Camille Monet on a Garden Bench
  - Poppies Blooming
- Albert Joseph Moore – Follow-my-Leader
- Camille Pissarro – Self-portrait
- Ilya Repin – Barge Haulers on the Volga
- John Roddam Spencer Stanhope – The Gentle Music of a Bygone Day
- Heinrich Strack – Berlin Victory Column
- James Tissot
  - The Captain's Daughter
  - The Last Evening
  - Too Early
  - Waiting for the Train
- James McNeill Whistler – Arrangement in Grey and Black, No. 2: Portrait of Thomas Carlyle

== Births ==
- January 28 – Charles Sims, English painter (suicide 1928)
- February 14 – Albert Guillaume, French painter and caricaturist (died 1942)
- March 13 – Léon Delagrange, French sculptor and aviator (died 1910)
- April 3 – Rista Vukanović, Serbian Impressionist painter and husband of painter Beta Vukanović (died 1918)
- April 4 – Élie Faure, French art historian (died 1937)
- April 24 – André Bauchant, French painter (died 1958)
- May 10 – Carl Eldh, Swedish painter and sculptor (died 1954)
- July 6 – Ethel Sands, American-born painter (died 1962)
- July 7 – Albert Moulton Foweraker, English painter (died 1942)
- October 12 – Nadežda Petrović, Serbian Fauvist painter (died 1915)
- December 5 – Julian Smith Australian surgeon and photographer was born in England (died 1947)
- date unknown – Jane Emmet de Glehn, American painter (died 1961)
- approximate date – Olowe of Ise, Yoruba wood sculptor (died c. 1938)

== Deaths ==
- March 25 – Wilhelm Marstrand, Danish painter (born 1810)
- April 17 – Fyodor Petrovich Tolstoy, Russian painter, engraver and silhouettist (born 1783)
- April 28 – Giovanni Maria Benzoni, Italian sculptor (born 1809)
- May 13 – Konstantin Danil, renowned Serbian painter (born 1798)
- May 19 – Charles Lucy, English painter (born 1814)
- July 8 – Franz Xaver Winterhalter, German painter (born 1805)
- October 2 – Cornelius Varley, English watercolor painter (born 1881)
- October 9 – John Evan Thomas, Welsh sculptor (born 1810)
- November 25 – Hans Harder, Danish painter and drawing master (born 1792)
- November 27 – Edmund Thomas Parris, English historical, portrait, subject, and panorama painter, book illustrator, designer and art restorer (born 1793)
- December 9 – William Bent Berczy, painter and political figure in Upper Canada (born 1791)
- date unknown
  - Nikola Aleksić, Serbian portraitist in both the Biedermeier and Nazarene movement (born 1808)
  - Thomas Frank Heaphy, English miniature painter (born 1813)
  - Ignatius Josephus van Regemorter, Flemish historical, landscape, and genre painter and engraver (born 1785)
