= Salon of 1873 =

1879 art exhibition in Paris

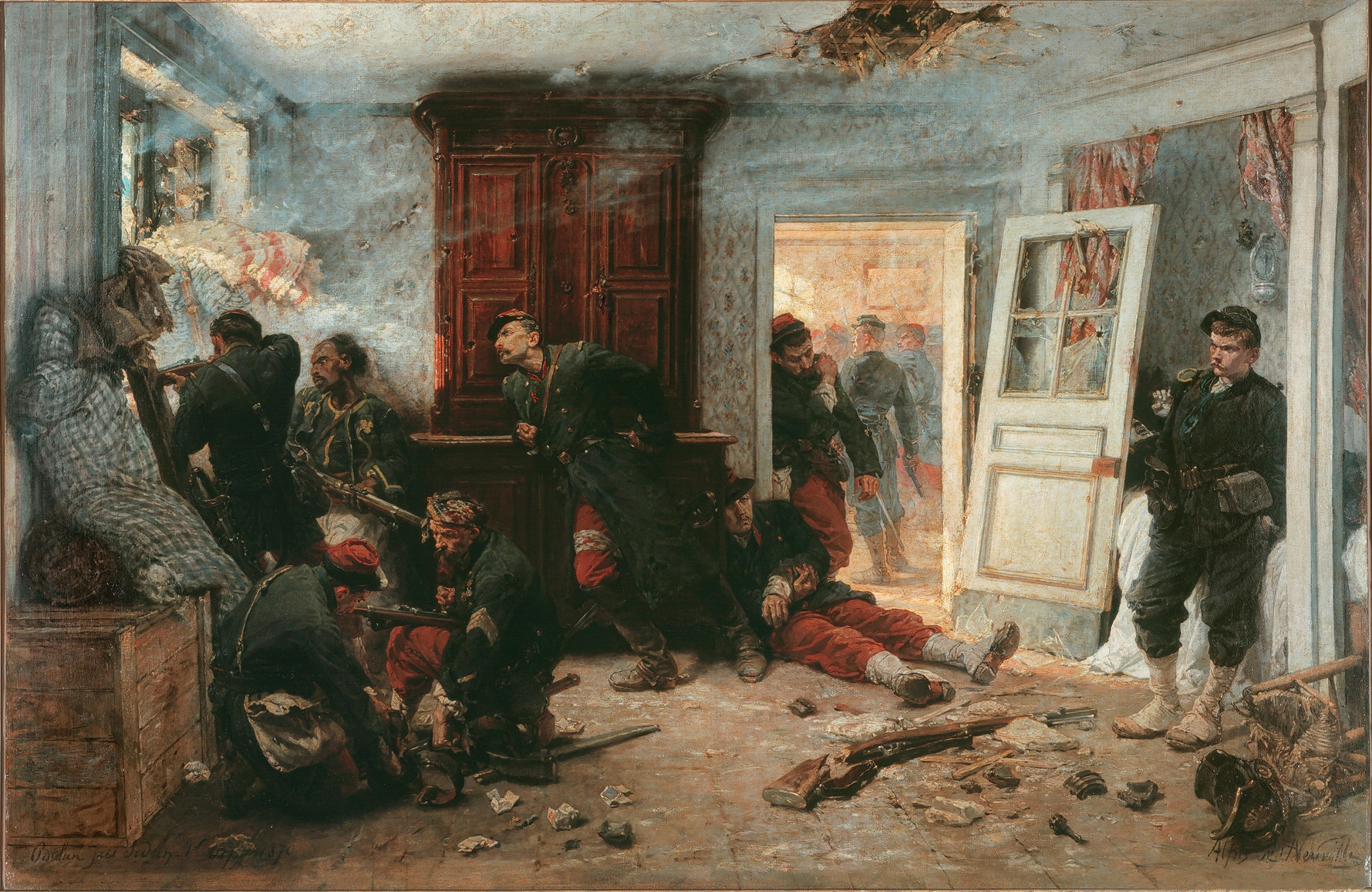
The Last Cartridges by Alphonse de Neuville

The Salon of 1873 was an art exhibition held at the Palace of Industry in Paris from 5 May 1873. The exhibition was the annual edition of the Salon organised by the Académie des Beaux-Arts and featured many leading painters and sculptors from the early Third Republic, although a separate Salon des Refusés was held the same year. Many of the works on display at this, the official Salon, reflected the ascendency of academic art of the Belle Époque.

One of the most noted paintings on display was The Last Cartridges by Alphonse de Neuville depicting the Battle of Bazeilles during the Franco-Prussian War. He shows a combined group of French soldiers holding off the attacking Bavarian troops, presenting their heroic defence in the midst of the defeat as a moral victory.

Édouard Manet submitted Le Bon Bock. William-Adolphe Bouguereau displayed his nude Nymphs and Satyr. Pierre Auguste Cot enjoyed success with Springtime.

== Gallery ==
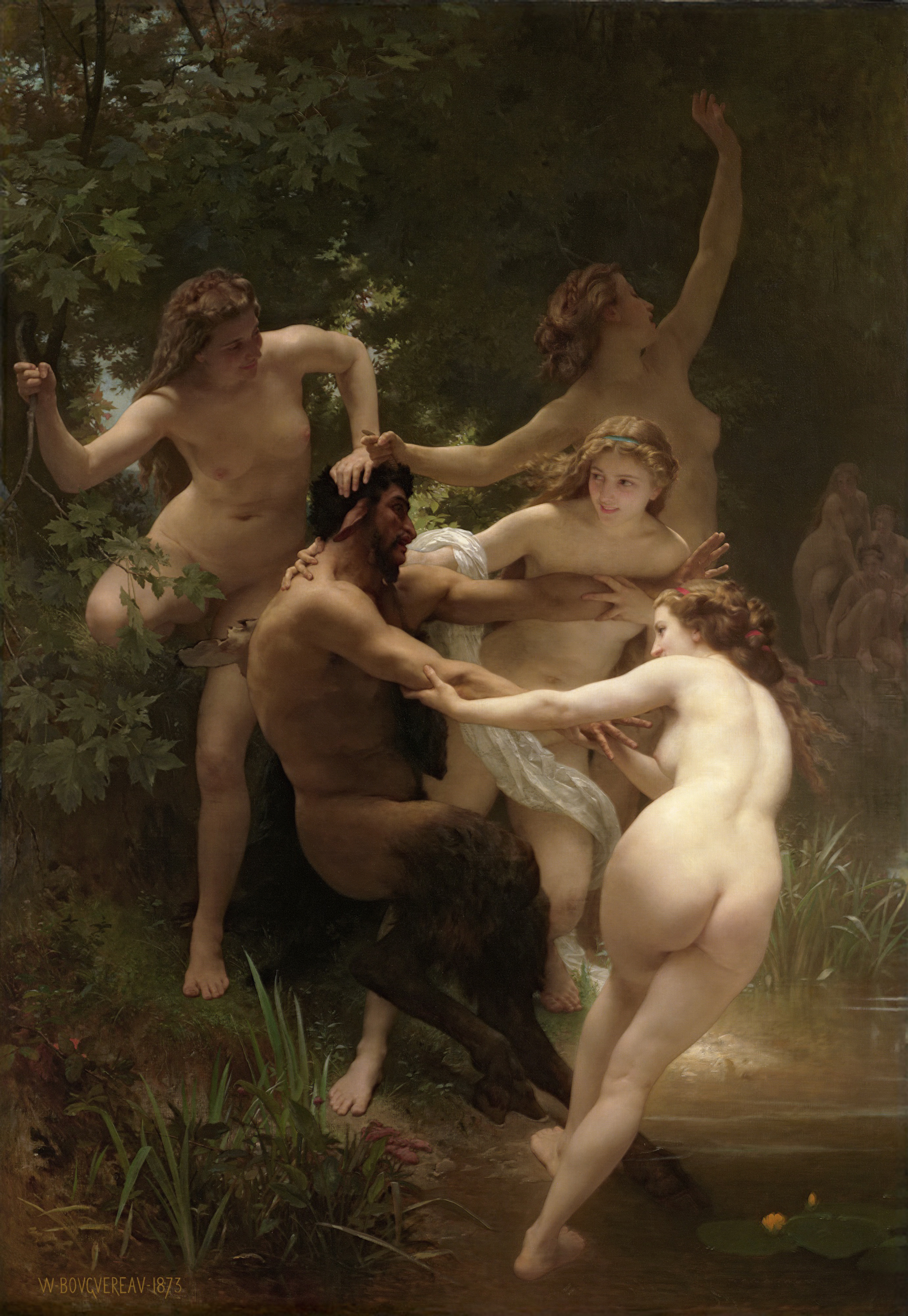
Nymphs and Satyr by William-Adolphe Bouguereau

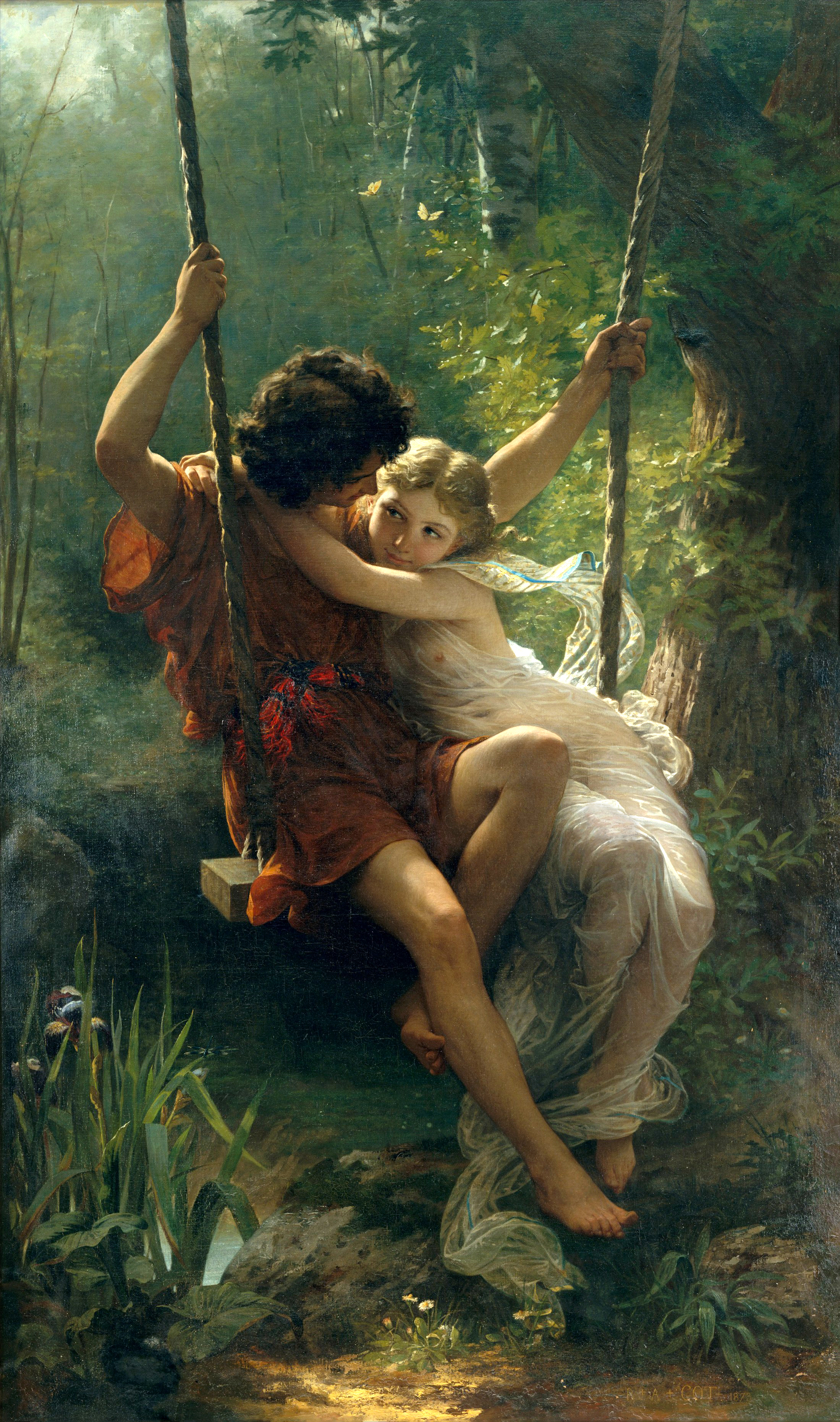
Springtime by Pierre Auguste Cot

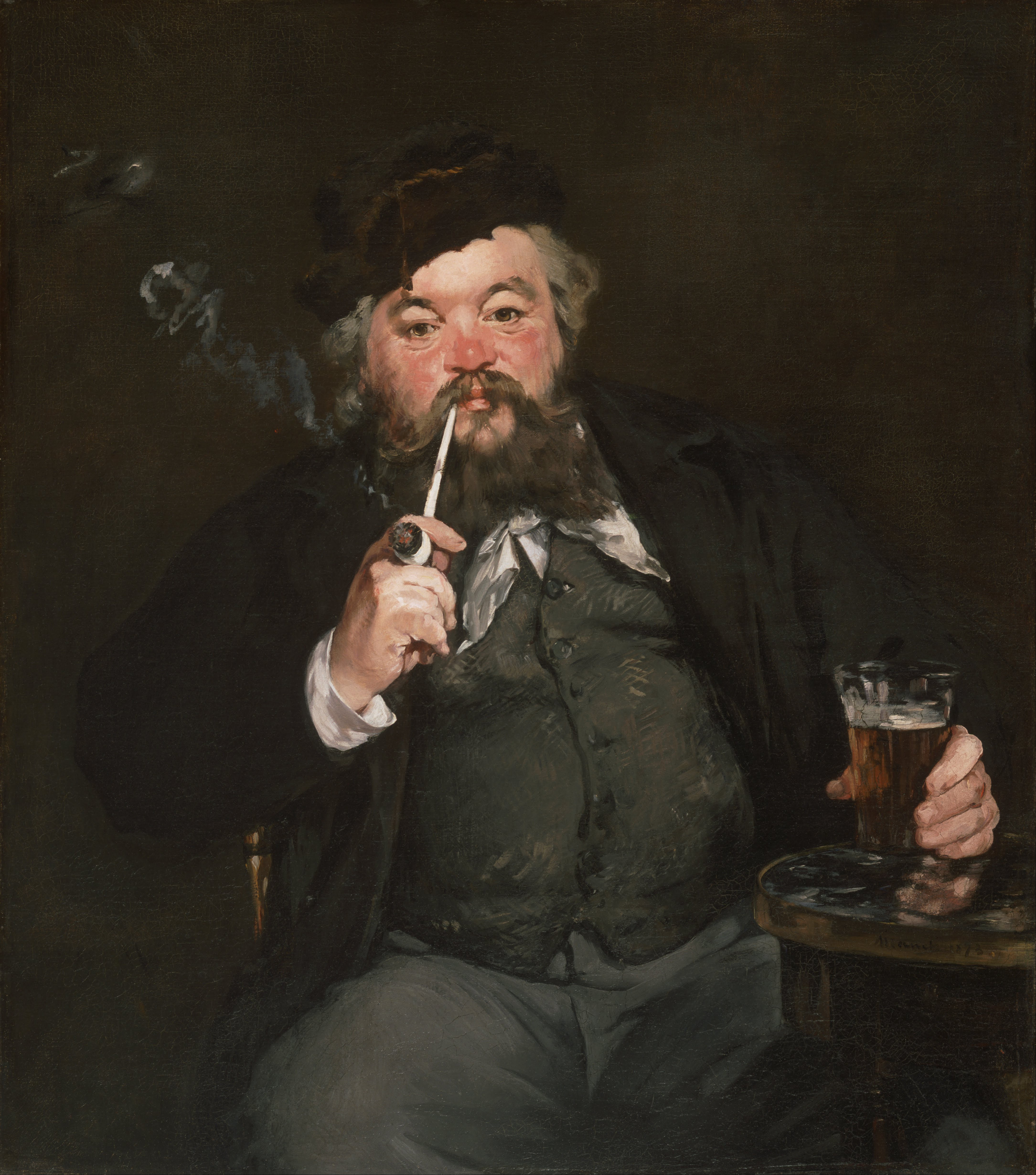
Le Bon Bock by Édouard Manet

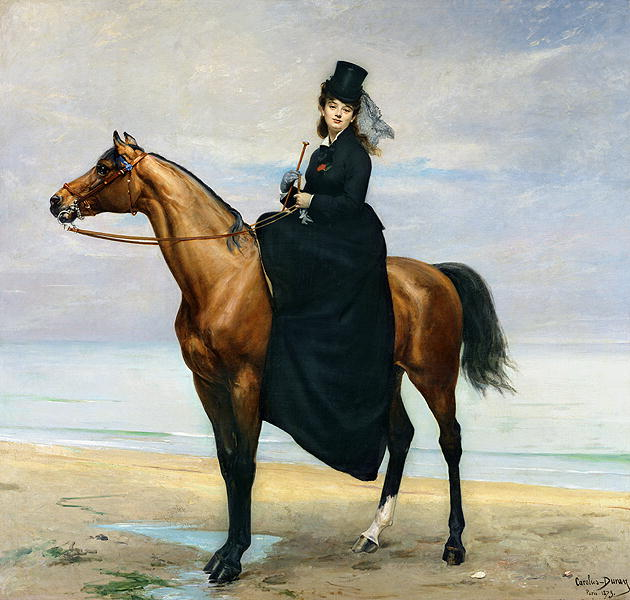
Equestrian Portrait of Mademoiselle Croizette by Carolus-Duran

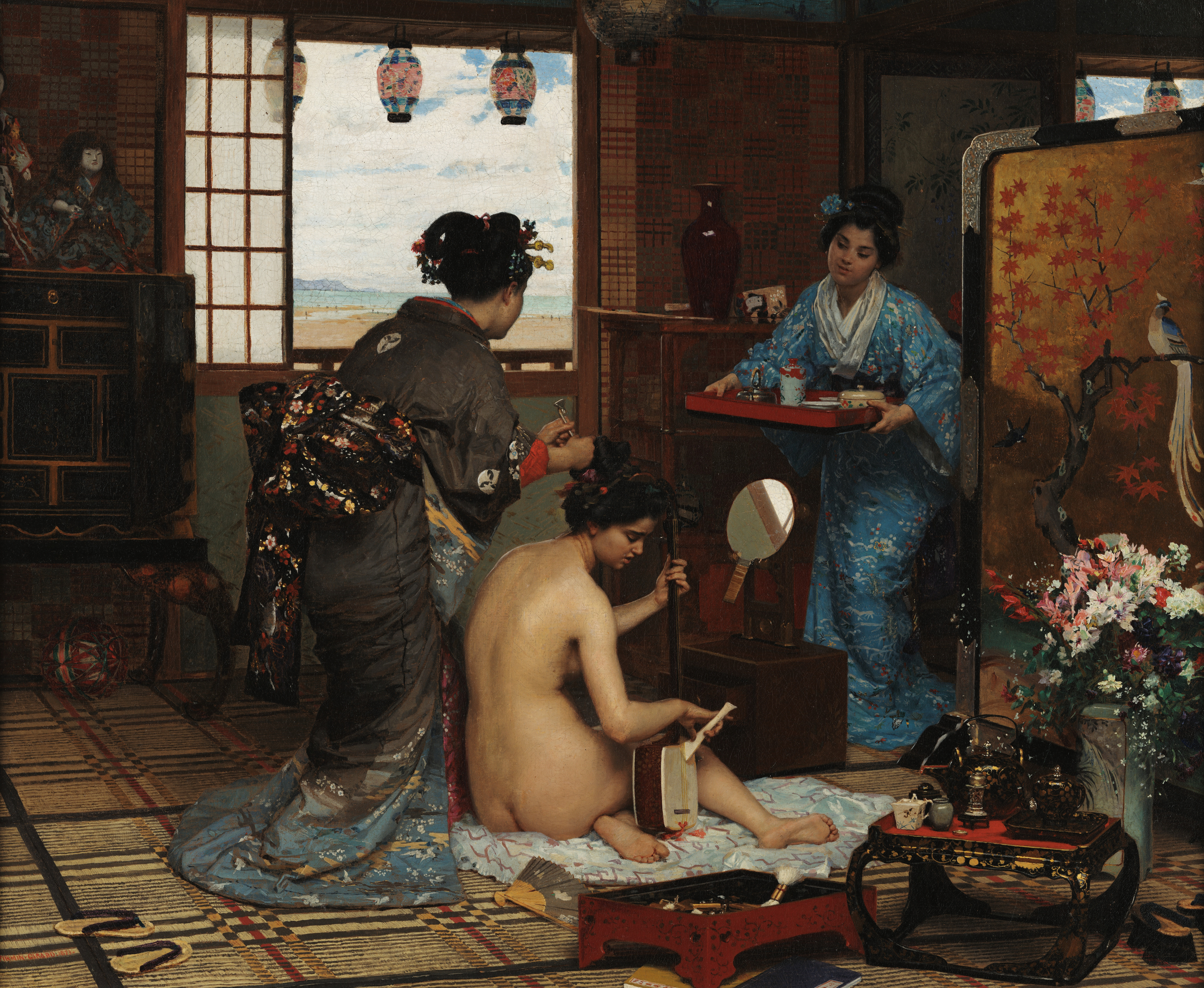
Toillette Japonaise by Marie-François Firmin-Girard

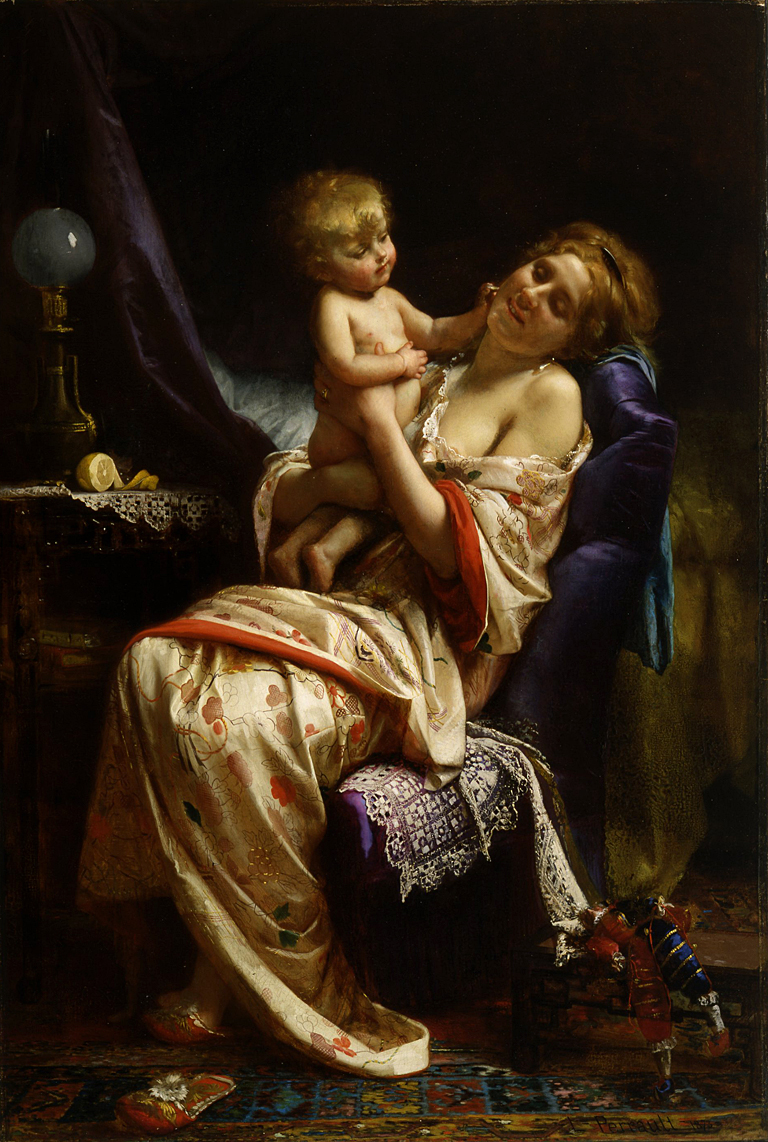
Maternity by Léon Perrault

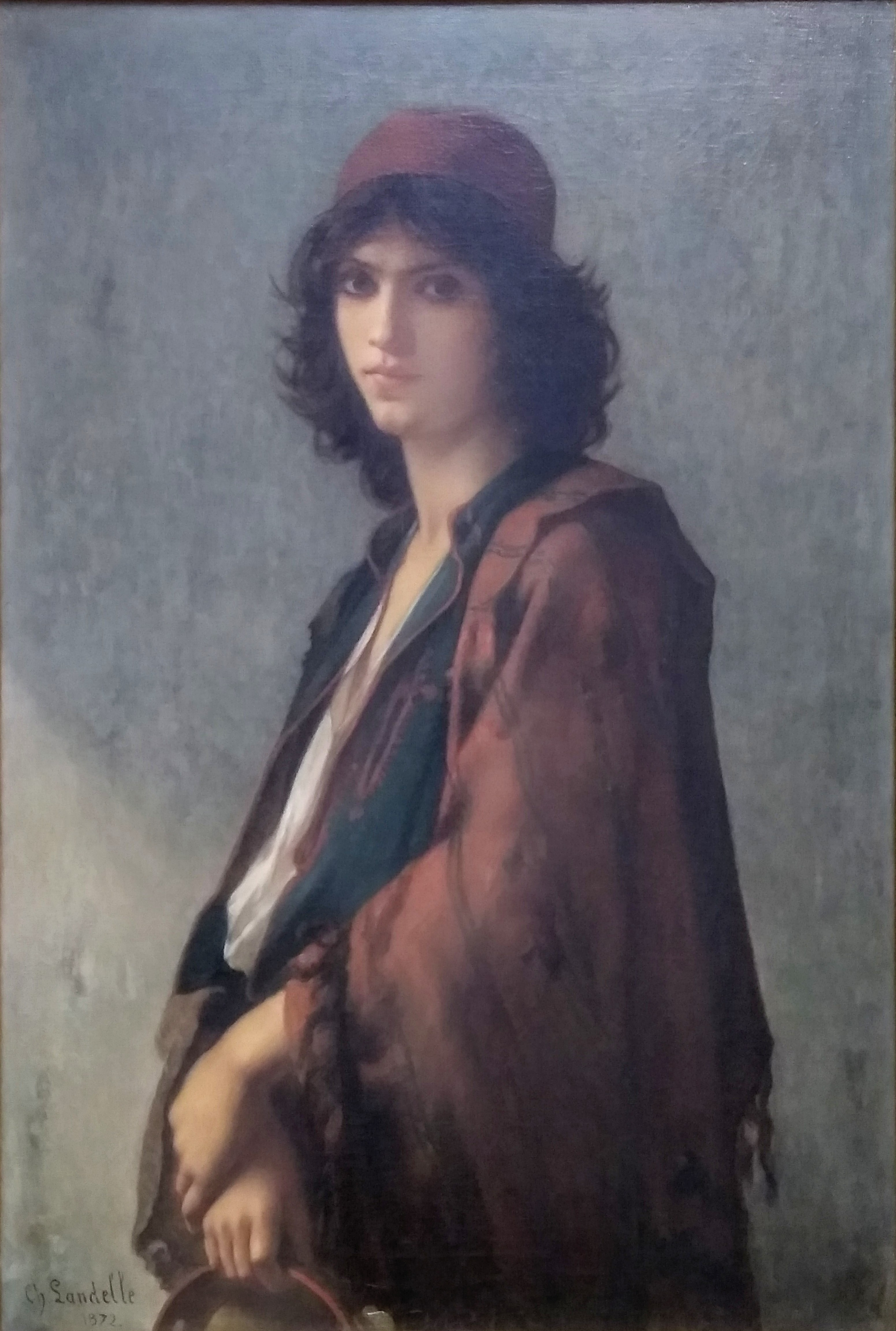
Young Serbian Gypsy Woman by Charles Landelle

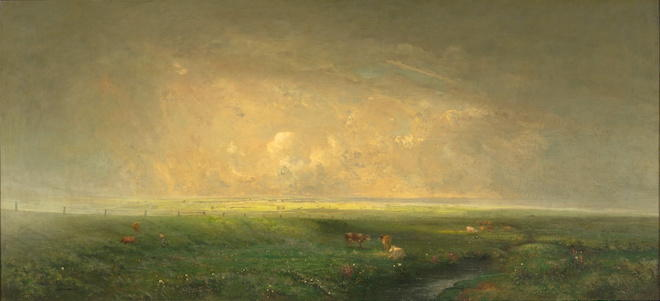
Rain and Sun by Antoine Chintreuil

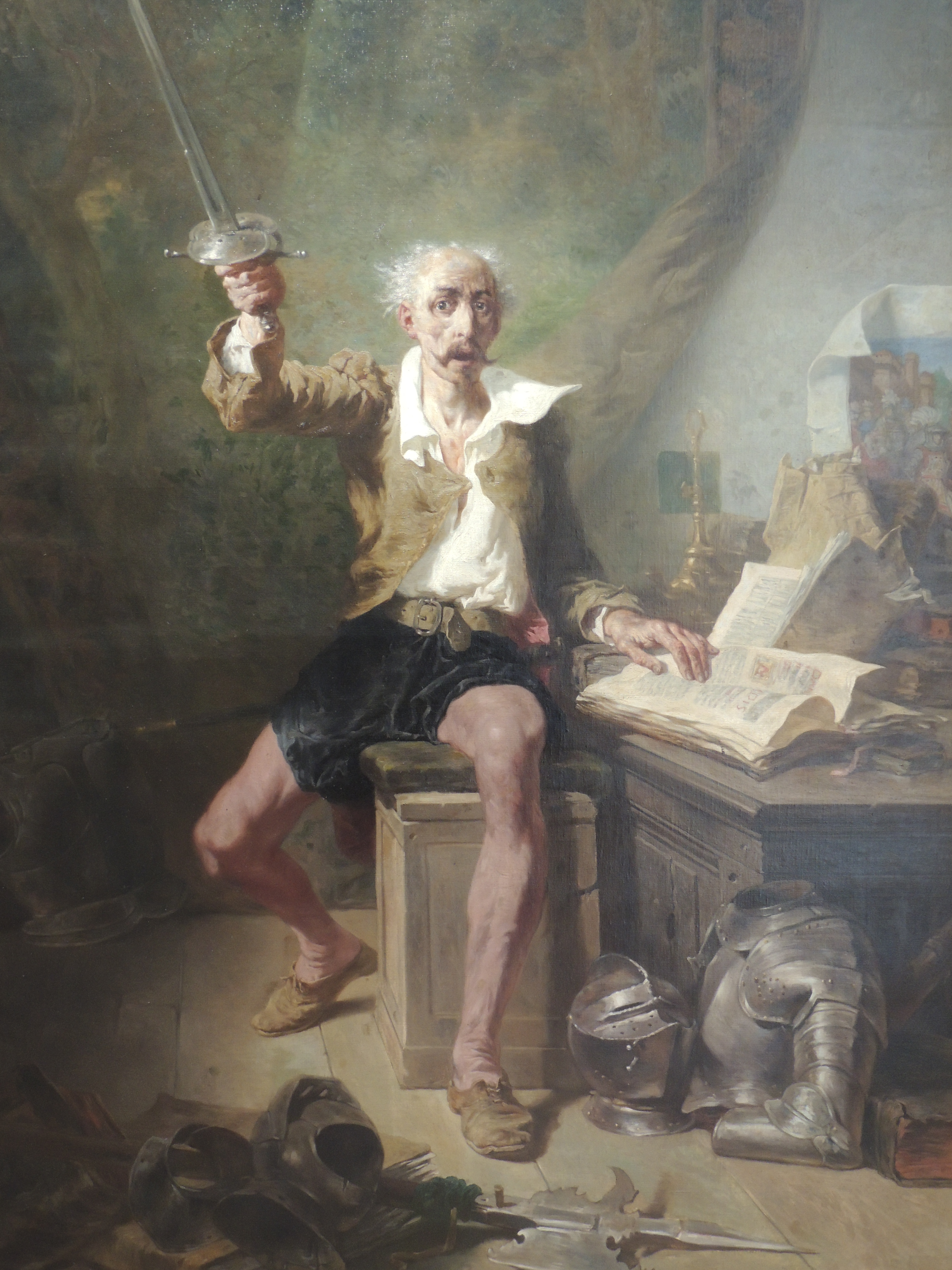
La lecture de Don Quichotte by Célestin Nanteuil

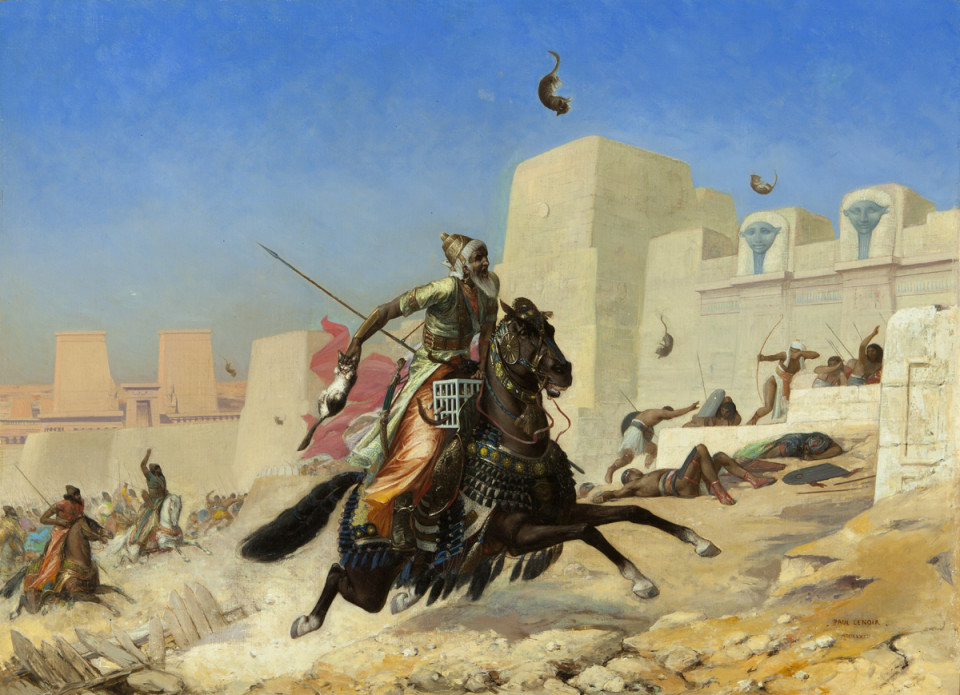
King Cambyses at the Siege of Pelusium by Paul-Marie Lenoir

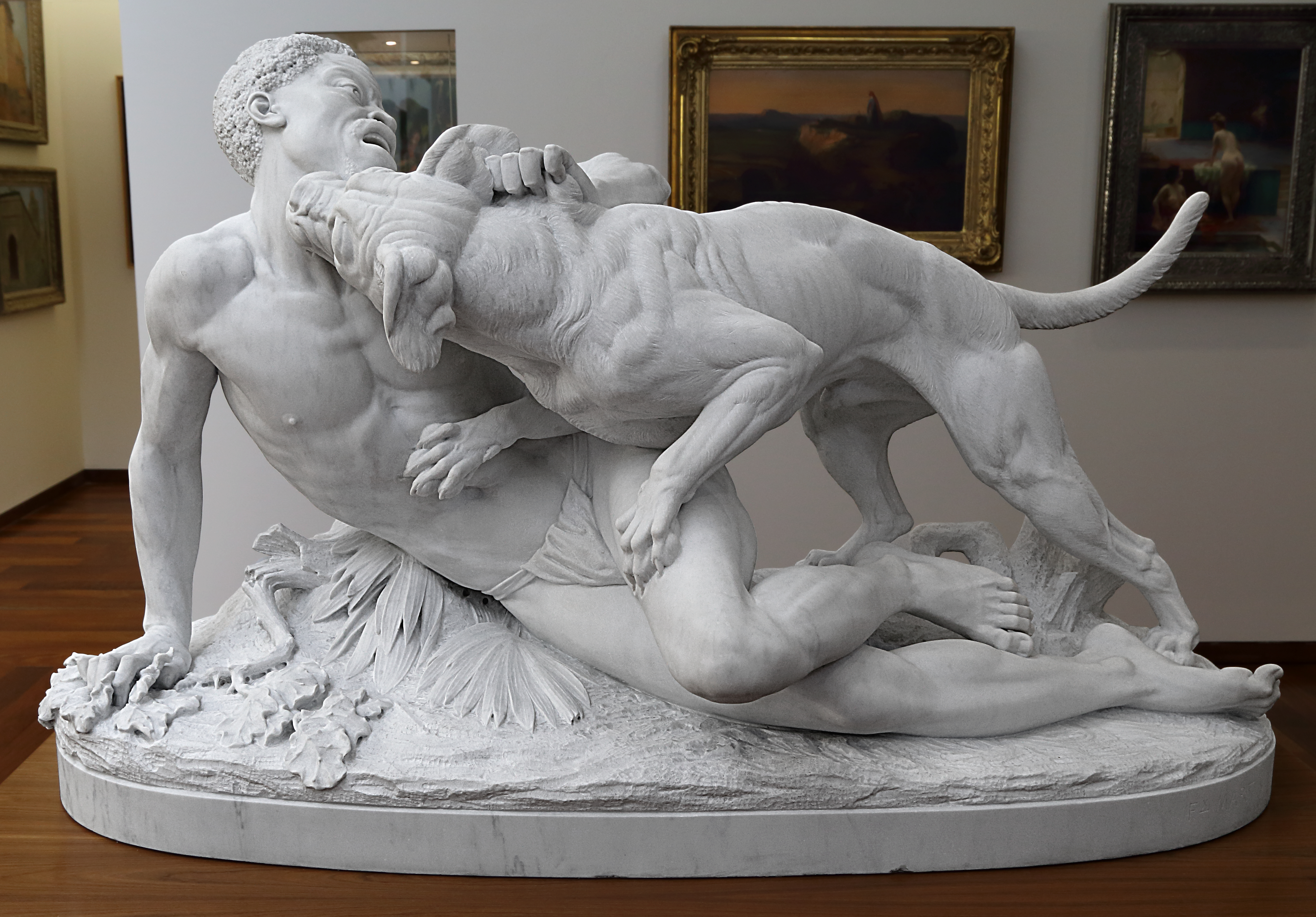
La Chasse au nègre by Félix Martin

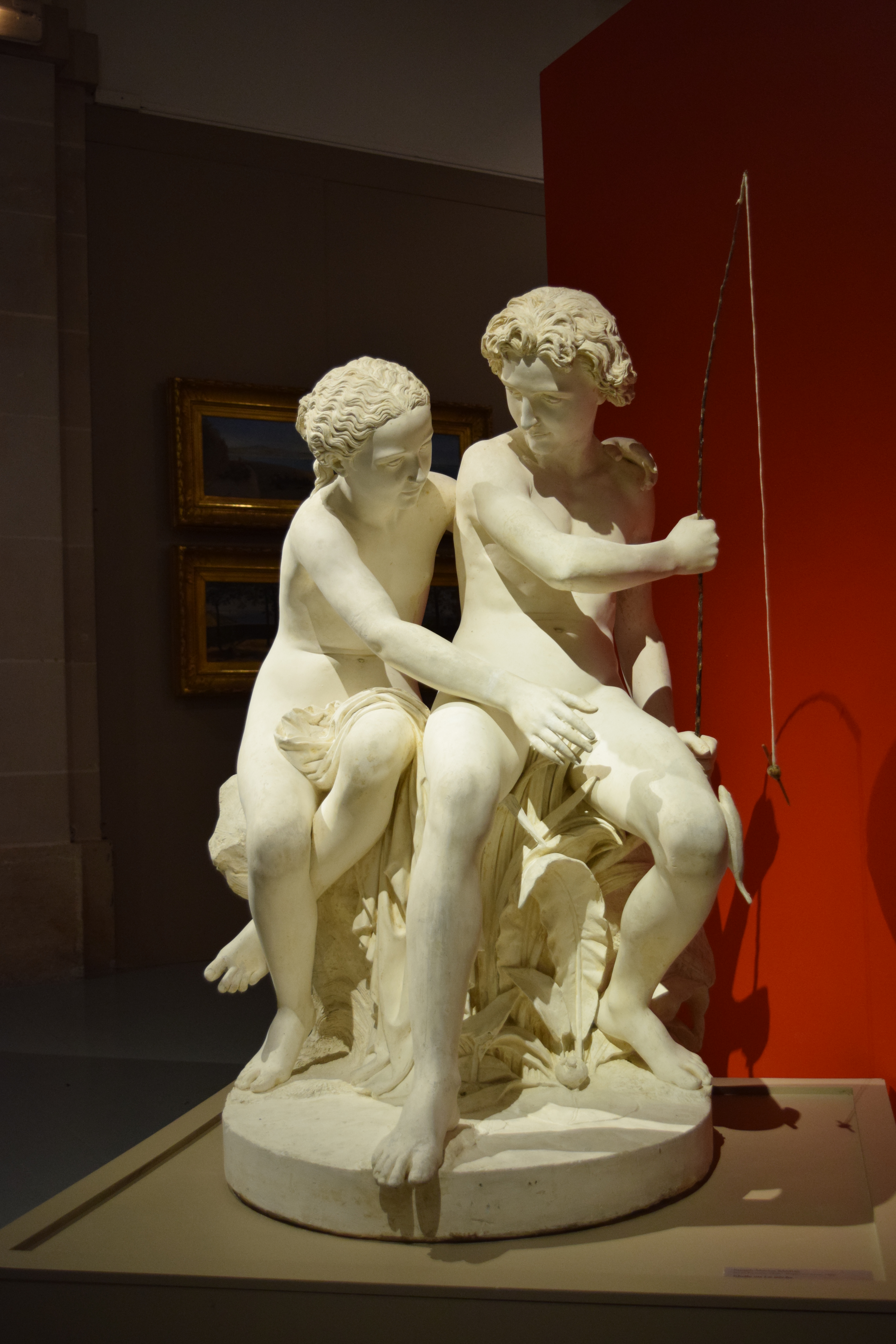
Idylle ou la pêche by Joseph-Marius Ramus

== See also ==
- Royal Academy Exhibition of 1873, held at Burlington House in London

== Bibliography ==
- Allard, Sébastien, Loyrette, Henri & Des Cars, Laurence. Nineteenth Century French Art: From Romanticism to Impressionism, Post-Impressionism and Art Nouveau. Rizzoli International Publications, 2007.
- Brauer, Fae. Rivals and Conspirators: The Paris Salons and the Modern Art Centre. Cambridge Scholars Publishing, 2014.
- Milner, John. Art, War and Revolution in France, 1870-1871: Myth, Reportage and Reality. Yale University Press, 2000.
