= The Last Evening =

The Last Evening may refer to:

- Episode 7 (Twin Peaks), also known as "The Last Evening", an episode of the American TV series Twin Peaks
- The Last Evening (painting), an 1873 oil painting by James Tissot
