= The Last Cartridges =

1897 film

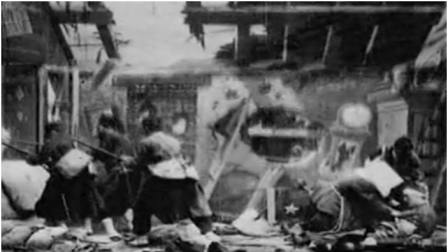
- Screenshot from the film
- Directed by: Georges Méliès
- Produced by: Star Film Company
- Distributed by: Star Film Company
- Release date: 1897
- Running time: 1min 11secs
- Country: France
- Languages: Silent; French intertitles

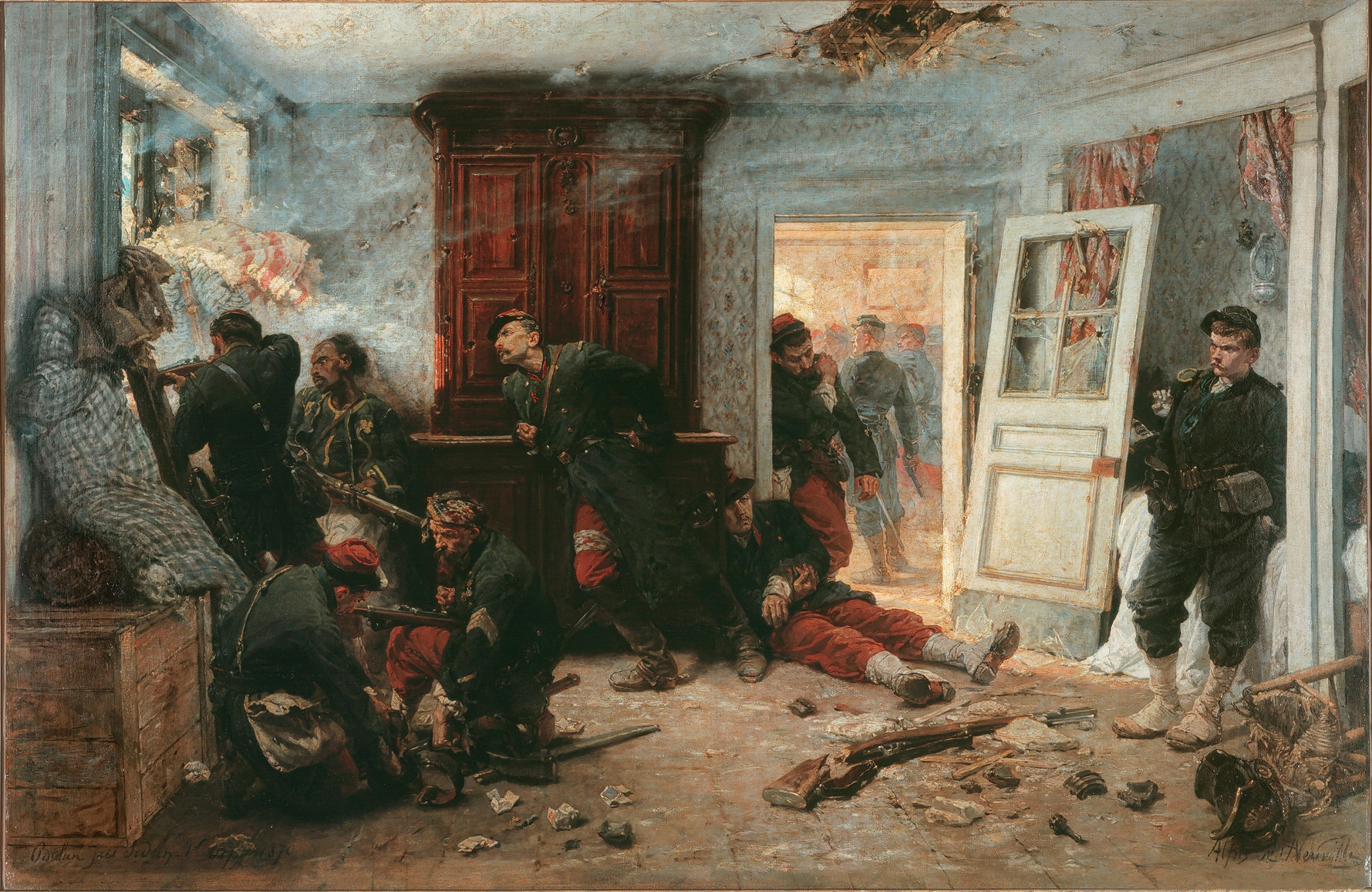
The Alphonse de Neuville painting that inspired the film

The Last Cartridges (French: Les Dernières Cartouches, also released as Bombardement d'une Maison; Star Film Catalogue no. 105) is an 1897 French short silent war film directed by Georges Méliès, based on the 1873 painting of the same name by Alphonse de Neuville. The film recreates the defense of a house at Bazeilles on 1 September 1870 at the Battle of Sedan during the Franco-Prussian War.

The film was a great success and inspired the Lumière, Pathé and Gaumont studios to film imitations.

== Synopsis ==
A group of soldiers attempt to defend a derelict house, where a nun cares for their wounded, but the house is bombed as they fire the last of the rounds of ammunition they have gathered from the floor.
