= Waiting for the Train =

Painting by James Tissot

- Artist: James Tissot
- Year: c. 1873
- Type: Oil on panel, genre painting
- Dimensions: 59.6 cm × 34.5 cm (23.5 in × 13.6 in)
- Location: Dunedin Public Art Gallery, Dunedin

Waiting for the Train is an oil painting on panel by the French artist James Tissot, from c. 1873. It is also known as Waiting for the Train (Willesden Junction). It is held at the Dunedin Public Art Gallery.

== History and description ==
A genre painting, it depicts a fashionably dressed young woman waiting at Willesden Junction railway station in London surrounded by luggage.

As often with Tissot's work the painting is somewhat ambiguous, as it is unclear exactly who the woman is. For many years it was thought that she might have been Tissot's mistress Kathleen Newton, and that her travelling companion was Tissot himself, given that his monogram is shown on one of the cases. The woman's clothing, however, make this less likely, as they seem to predate the time of Tissot and Newton's relationship. It is more likely that a professional model was used to pose for the work.

The painting was produced during Tissot's time in Britain, where he moved at the time of the Franco-Prussian war. The painting is at the Dunedin Public Art Gallery, which acquired it in 1921 through a bequest of some £90 from local art enthusiast Thomas Brown.

== Bibliography ==
- Ash, Russell (1992) James Tissot. London: Pavilion Press.
- Entwisle, Peter (1990) Treasures of the Dunedin Public Art Gallery. Dunedin: Dunedin Public Art Gallery. ISBN 0-959-77589-7
- Kennedy, Ian G. & Treuherz, Julian (2008) The Railway: Art in the Age of Steam. New Haven, CT: Yale University Press.
- Welsh, Dave (2010) Underground Writing: The London Tube from George Gissing to Virginia Woolf. Liverpool: Liverpool University Press.
- Wentworth, Michael (1984) James Tissot. Oxford: Clarendon Press.
