= The Captain's Daughter (painting) =

Painting by James Tissot

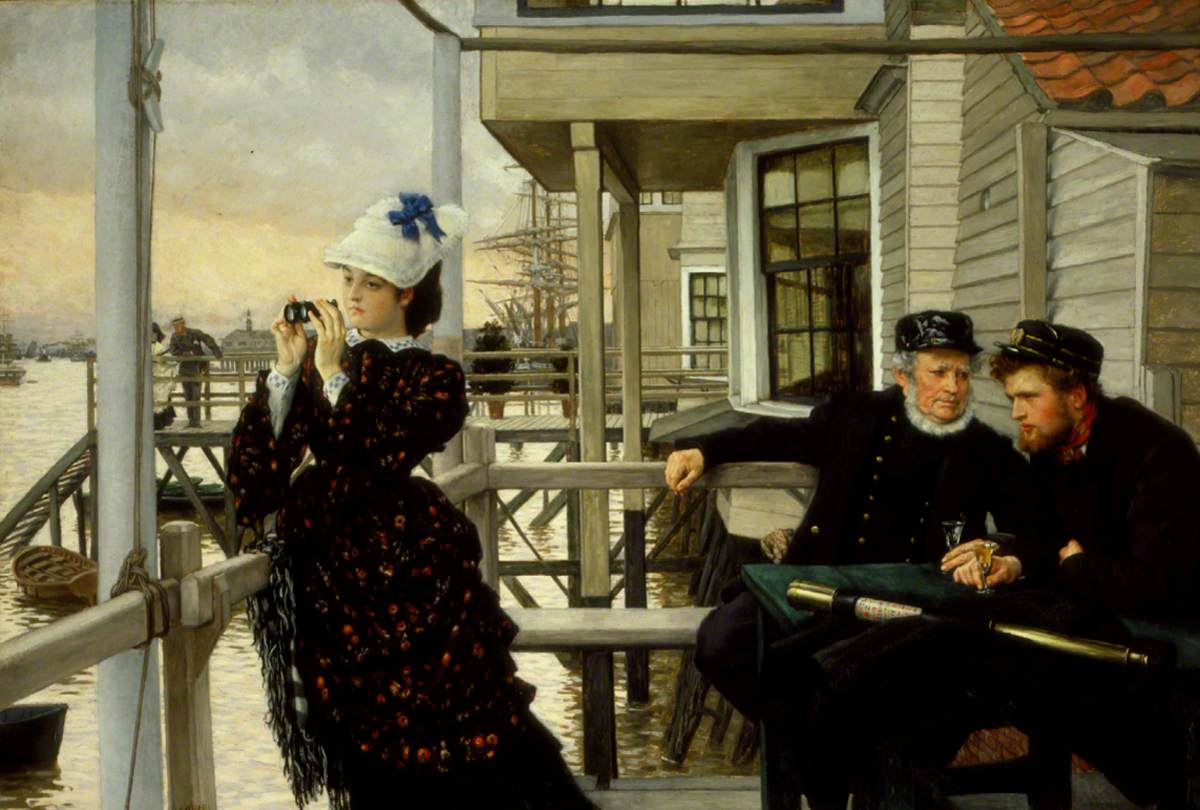
- Artist: James Tissot
- Year: 1873
- Type: Oil on canvas, genre painting
- Dimensions: 72 cm × 104.8 cm (28 in × 41.3 in)
- Location: Southampton City Art Gallery, Southampton

The Captain's Daughter is an oil painting on canvas by the French artist James Tissot, from 1873.

== History and description ==
While the exact scene depicted is unclear, it appears that the younger man is attempting to unsuccessfully court the captain's daughter either because she is not interested or because her father is proving difficult to win over. Other interpretations suggest the older man is trying to bolster the younger's confidence with alcohol and advice. The young woman herself is turned away from them to stare at the shipping in the river. It was displayed at the Royal Academy Exhibition of 1873 held at Burlington House in London. It has sometimes been confused with another painting Tissot exhibited there the same year The Last Evening. Today the painting is in the collection of the City Art Gallery in Southampton, having been acquired in 1934.

== Bibliography ==
- Kern, Stephen. Eyes of Love: The Gaze in English and French Paintings and Novels, 1840-1900. Reaction Books, 1996.
- Marshall, Nancy Rose & Warner, Malcolm. James Tissot: Victorian Life, Modern Love. Yale University Press, 1999.
- Wentworth, Michael. James Tissot. Clarendon Press, 1984.
