= The Last Cartridges (painting) =

Painting by Alphonse de Neuville

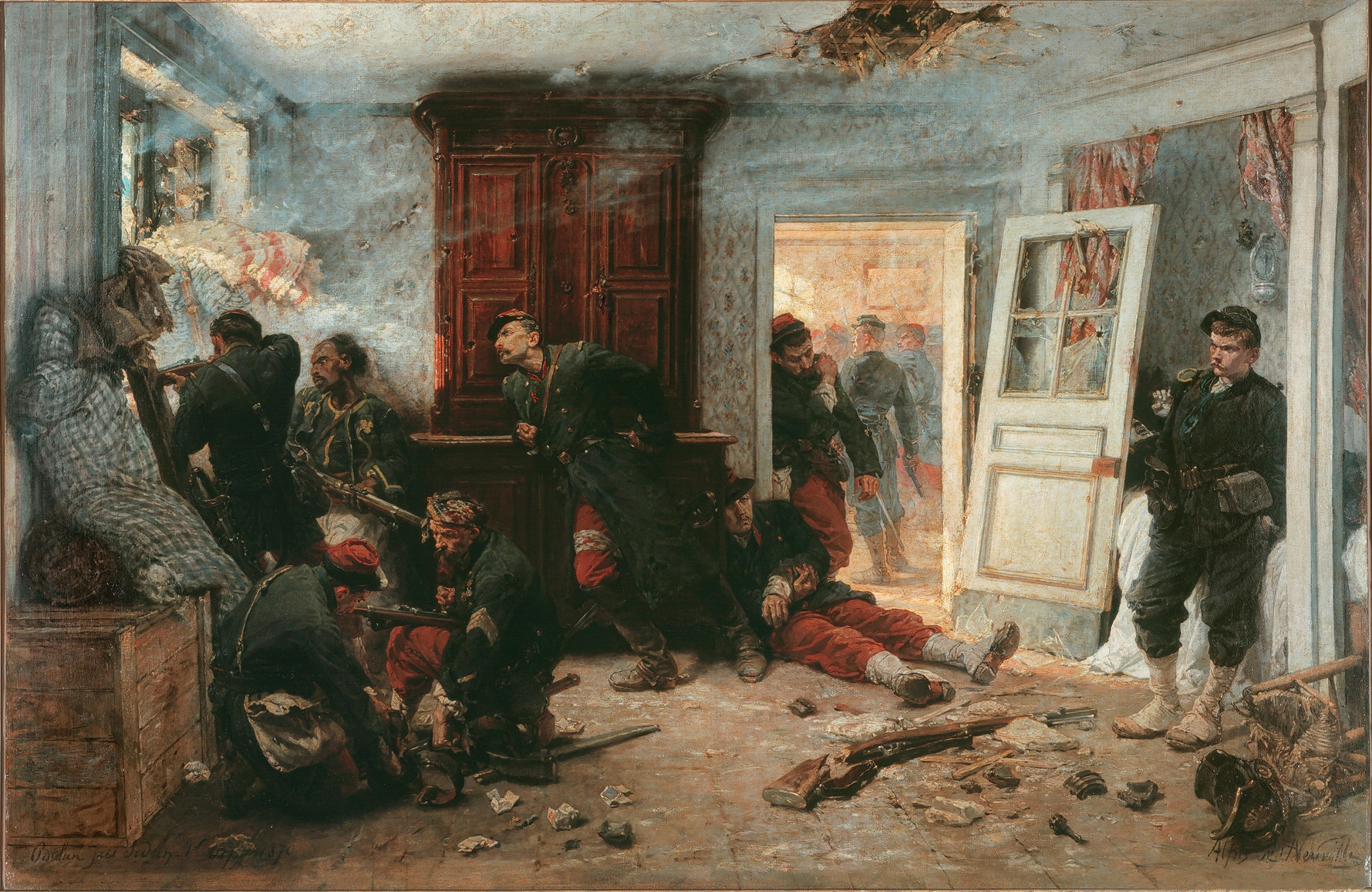
- Artist: Alphonse de Neuville
- Year: 1873
- Type: Oil on canvas, history painting
- Dimensions: 280 cm × 420 cm (109 in × 165 in)
- Location: Maison de la dernière cartouche; Bazeilles

The Last Cartridges (French: Les Dernières Cartouches) is an oil on canvas painting by the French artist Alphonse de Neuville, from 1873.

It recreates an incident of the Franco-Prussian War, when the French defenders of Bazeilles fought to the last cartridge during the 1870 Battle of Sedan. The fighting at Bazeilles was celebrated by the French nation as a moral victory amidst an otherwise catastrophic defeat. The painting was displayed at the Salon of 1873 in Paris. The art critic Arsène Alexandre described it as "a painting which makes us lift our heads again"

== See also ==
- The Last Cartridges, an 1897 film inspired by the painting

== Bibliography ==
- Fermer, Douglas. Sedan 1870: The Eclipse of France. Pen and Sword, 2016.
- Milner, John. Art, War and Revolution in France, 1870-1871: Myth, Reportage and Reality. Yale University Press, 2000.
- Thomson, Richard. The Troubled Republic: Visual Culture and Social Debate in France, 1889-1900. Yale University Press, 2004.
