= Nymphs and Satyr =

Painting by William-Adolphe Bouguereau

- Nymphes et Satyre (French)
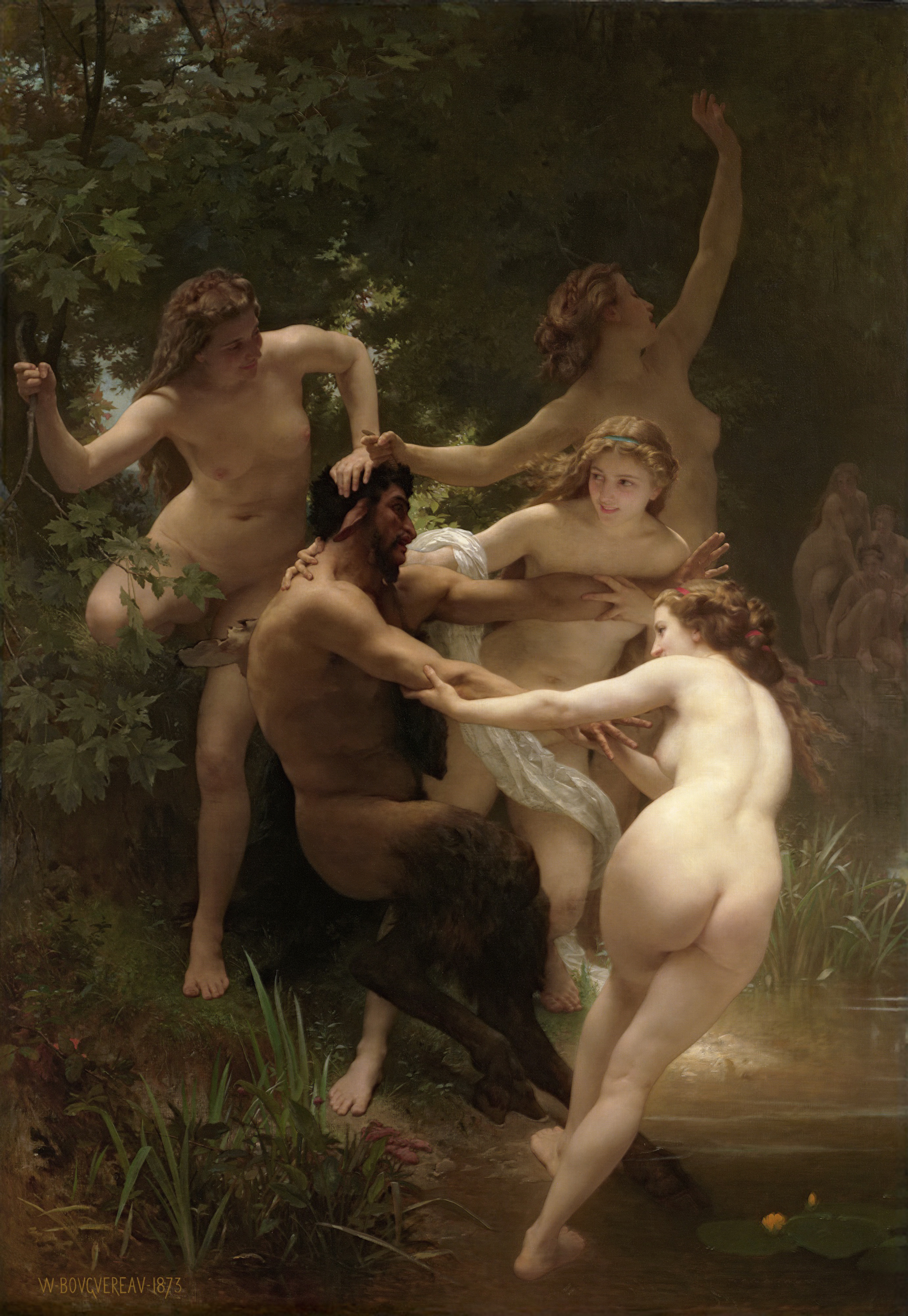
- Artist: William-Adolphe Bouguereau
- Year: 1873
- Medium: Oil on canvas
- Dimensions: 260 cm × 180 cm (100 in × 71 in)
- Location: Clark Art Institute; Williamstown

Nymphs and Satyr (French: Nymphes et Satyre) is an oil on canvas painting created by the French artist William-Adolphe Bouguereau in 1873. The painting depicts a satyr and a group of nymphs from Greek mythology.

Nymphs and Satyr was exhibited in Paris at the 1873 Salon, which opened on 5 May, a year before the Impressionists mounted their first exhibition. It was displayed along with a verse from the ancient Roman poet, Publius Statius: "Conscious of his shaggy hide and from childhood untaught to swim, he dares not trust himself to deep waters."

One critic called it "the greatest painting of our generation". Purchased for 35,000 francs by the American art collector and speculator John Wolfe on 26 June, 1873, it was displayed in his mansion for many years alongside other high-style French academic paintings. It was sold at auction in 1888, after which the painting was displayed in the bar of the Hoffman House Hotel, New York City until 1901, when it was bought and stored in a warehouse, the buyer hoping to keep its 'offensive' content from the public. Robert Sterling Clark discovered the piece in storage and acquired it in 1942. The piece is currently on display at the Clark Art Institute located in Williamstown, Massachusetts.

According to the Clark Institute, in the painting, which is based on the Greek mythology, "a group of nymphs have been surprised, while bathing in a secluded pond, by a lascivious satyr. Some of the nymphs have retreated into the shadows on the right; others, braver than their friends, are trying to dampen the satyr's ardor by pulling him into the cold water – one of the satyr's hooves is already wet and he clearly wants to go no further. Bouguereau’s working methods were traditional; he made a number of sketches and drawings of carefully posed human figures in complicated interconnected poses, linking them together in this wonderfully rhythmical composition."

The painting, the largest and one of the most beloved of the Clark collection, was cleaned prior to March 10, 2012, with the help of a grant from the Parnassus Foundation, courtesy of Jane and Raphael Bernstein.

== See also ==
- William-Adolphe Bouguereau gallery
