= The Last Evening (painting) =

Painting by James Tissot

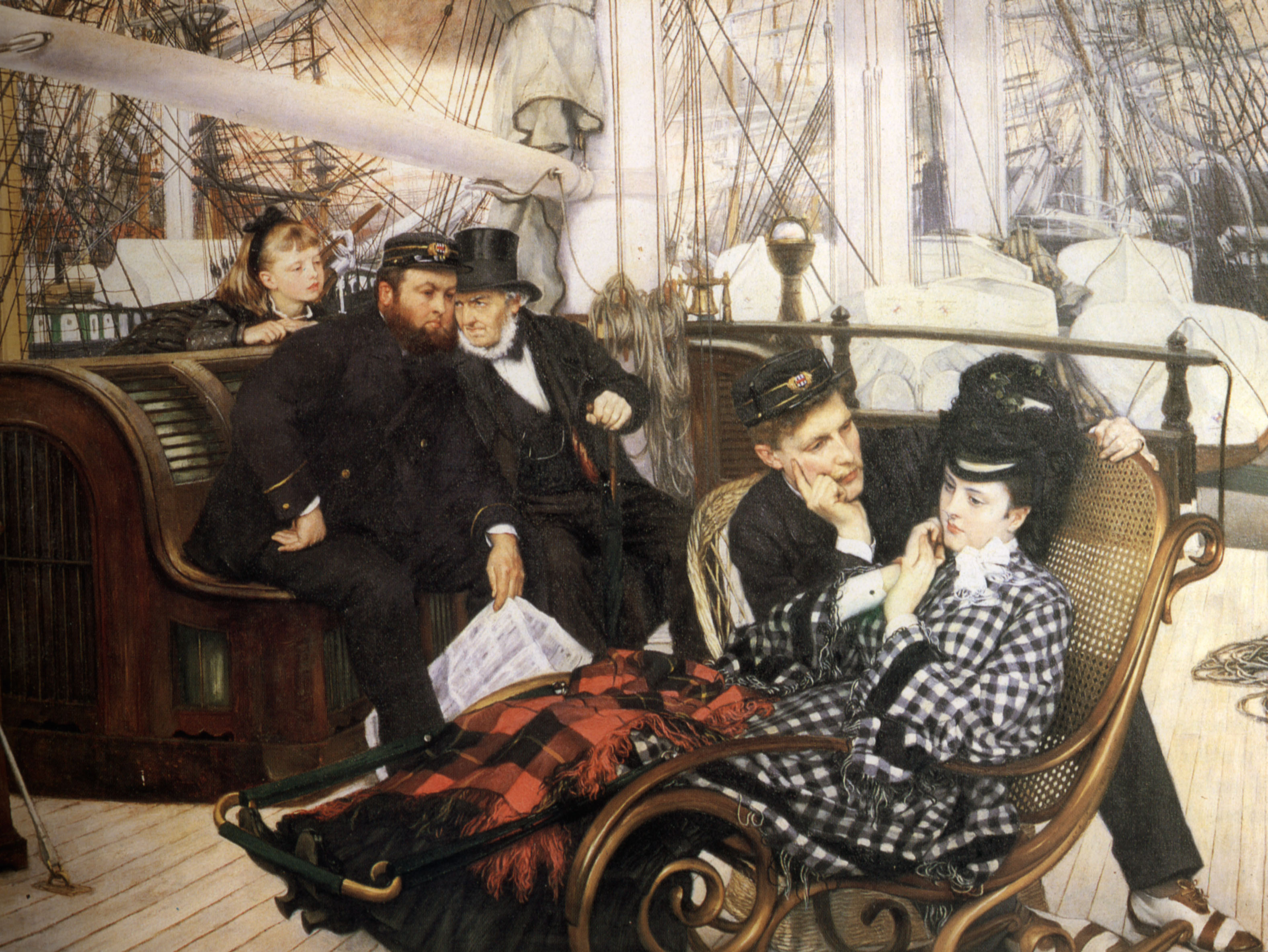
- Artist: James Tissot
- Year: 1873
- Type: Oil on canvas, genre painting
- Dimensions: 71 cm × 103 cm (28 in × 41 in)
- Location: Guildhall Art Gallery, London

The Last Evening is an oil painting on canvas by the French artist James Tissot, from 1873. It shows a scene set aboard a ship, but it is unclear exactly the context or the relationship between the various figures. It has occasionally been confused with another painting Tissot produced that year, The Captain's Daughter.

The painting was produced during the period that Tissot relocated to Britain following the Franco-Prussian War. It was displayed at the Royal Academy Exhibition of 1873 held at Burlington House in Piccadilly. It was subsequently acquired by the art collector Charles Gassiot who donated it to the Guildhall Art Gallery in the City of London in 1902.

== Bibliography ==
- Bernstein, Susan David & Michie, Elsie B. (ed.) Victorian Vulgarity: Taste in Verbal and Visual Culture. Routledge, 2016.
- Marshall, Nancy Rose & Warner, Malcolm. James Tissot: Victorian Life, Modern Love. Yale University Press, 1999.
- Wentworth, Michael. James Tissot. Clarendon Press, 1984.
