= Royal Academy Exhibition of 1863 =

1863 art exhibition in London

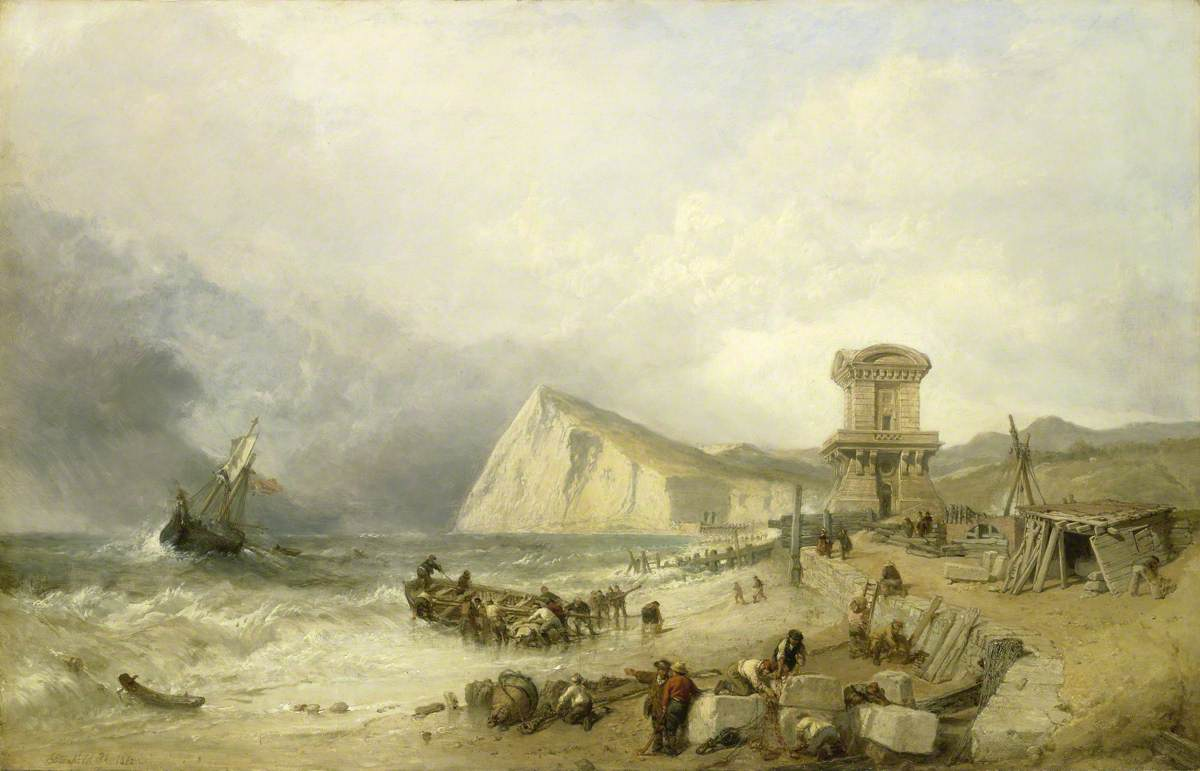
Shakespeare Cliff, Dover by Clarkson Stanfield

The Royal Academy Exhibition of 1863 was the ninety fifth Summer Exhibition of the British Royal Academy of Arts. It was held at the National Gallery in London from 4 May to 25 July 1863. The former Pre-Raphaelite John Everett Millais exhibited The Eve of St Agnes.

David Roberts exhibited a number of works. These included views of the River Thames St Paul's Looking East and St Paul's Looking West. Other paintings on display included The Coronation of the King of Prussia by George Housman Thomas, commissioned by Queen Victoria. Charles Lucy featured a depiction of the reconciliation between Gainsborough and Reynolds, founding members of the Academy and longer-term rivals. Several of the group who became known as the St John's Wood Clique displayed scenes from British history.

John Brett submitted his Pre-Raphaelite landscape painting Florence from Bellosguardo but this was rejected by the hanging committee. The Anglo-American artist James McNeill Whistler displayed The Last of Old Westminster, showing the construction of the new Westminster Bridge on the River Thames. However Whistler's seascape The Blue Wave, Biarritz was rejected by the Hanging Committee.

== Gallery ==
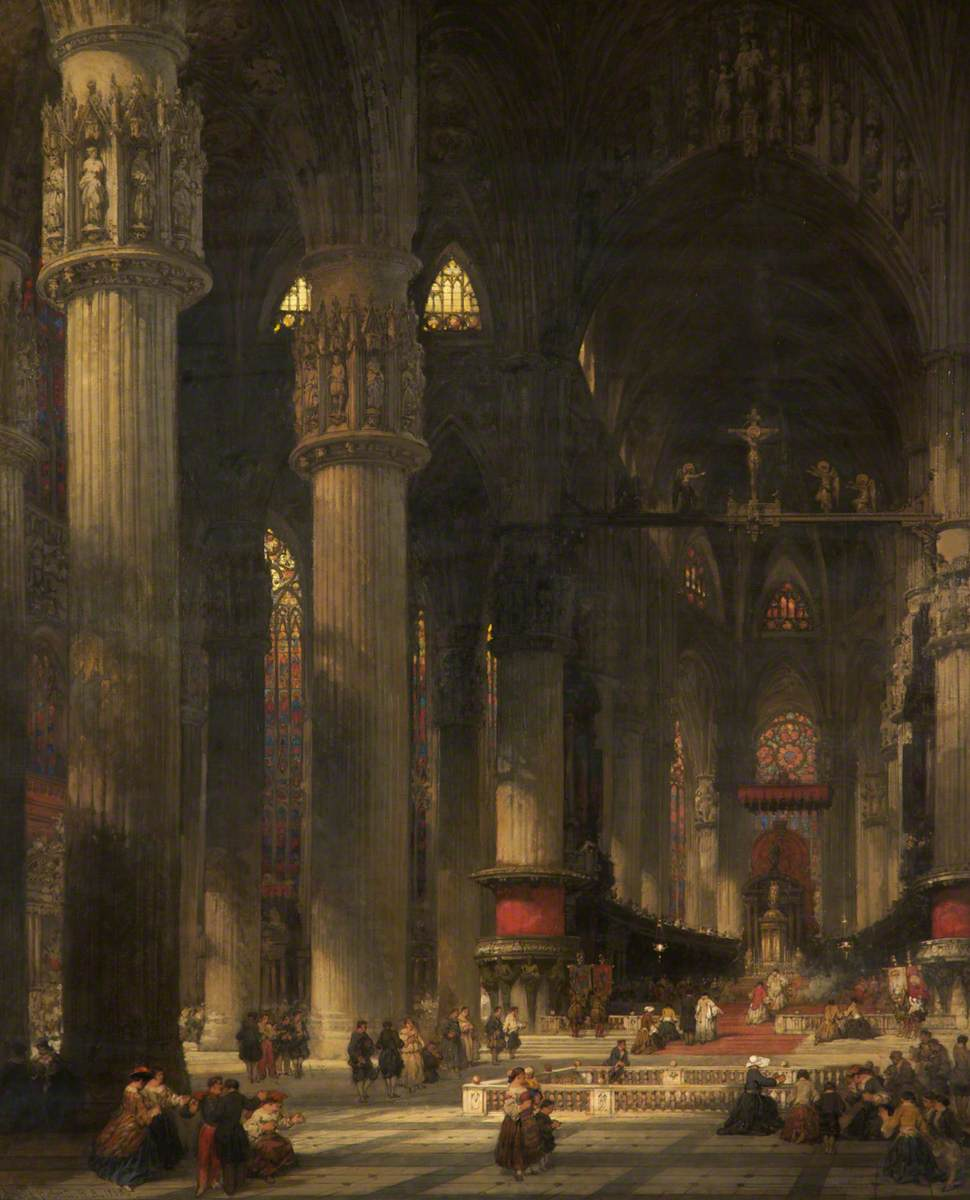
Milan Cathedral by David Roberts

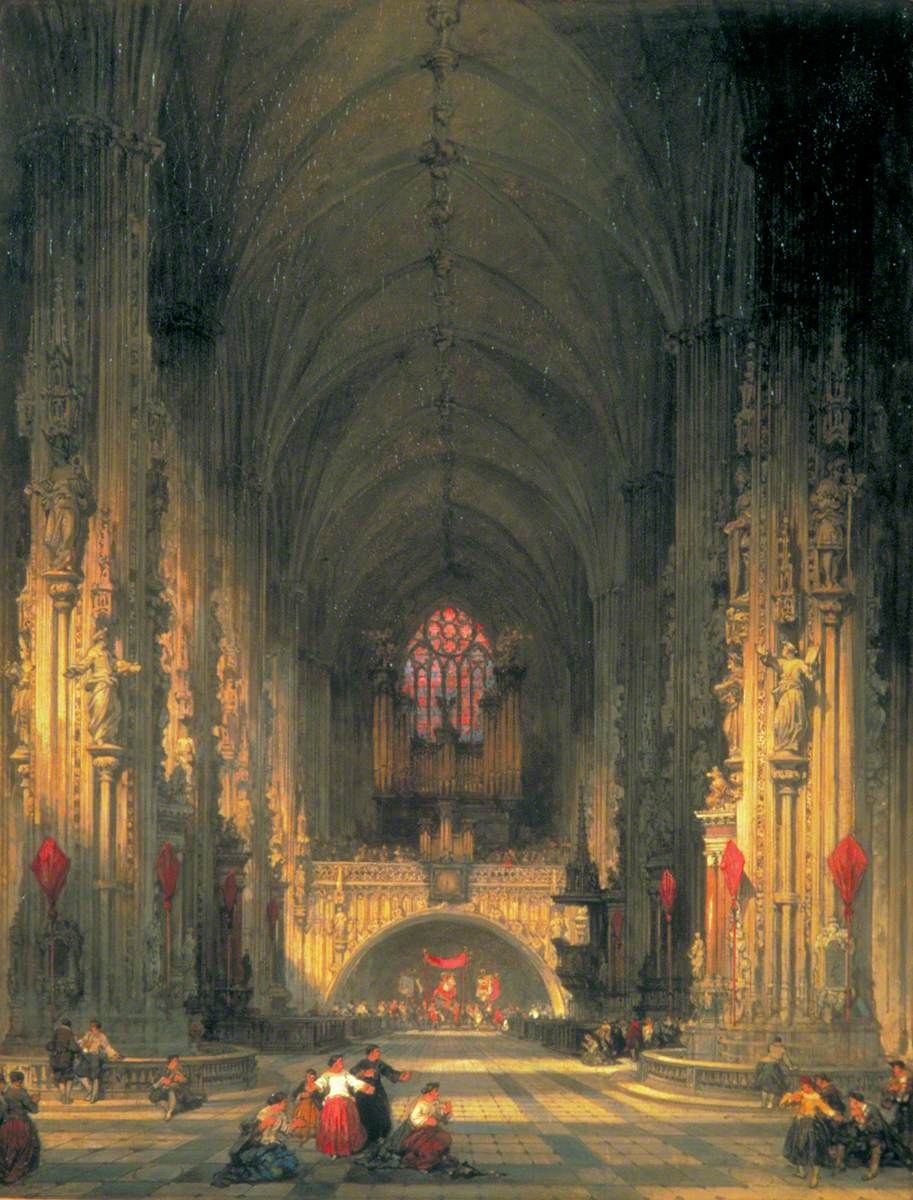
Church of St Stephen's, Vienna by David Roberts

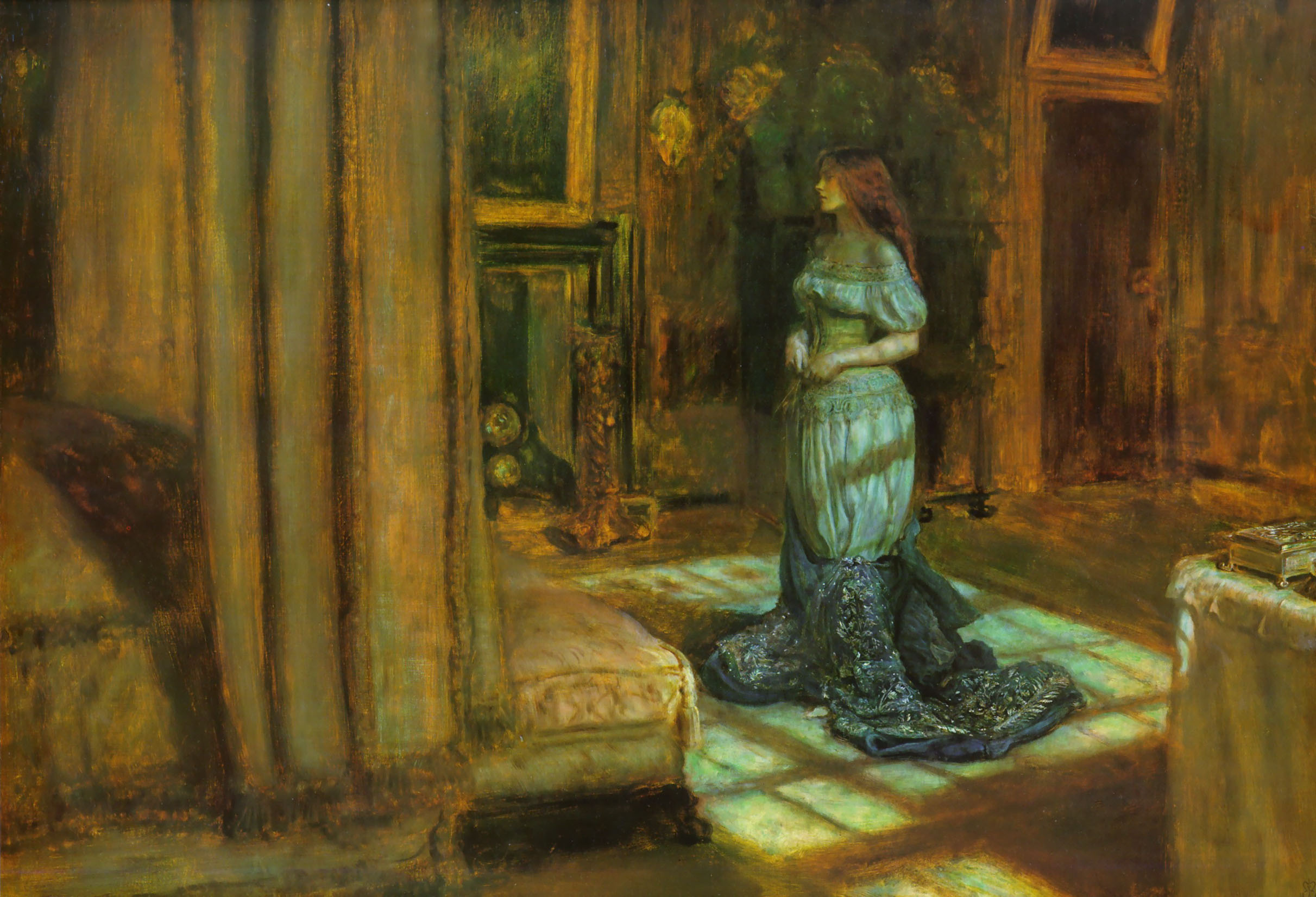
The Eve of St Agnes by John Everett Millais

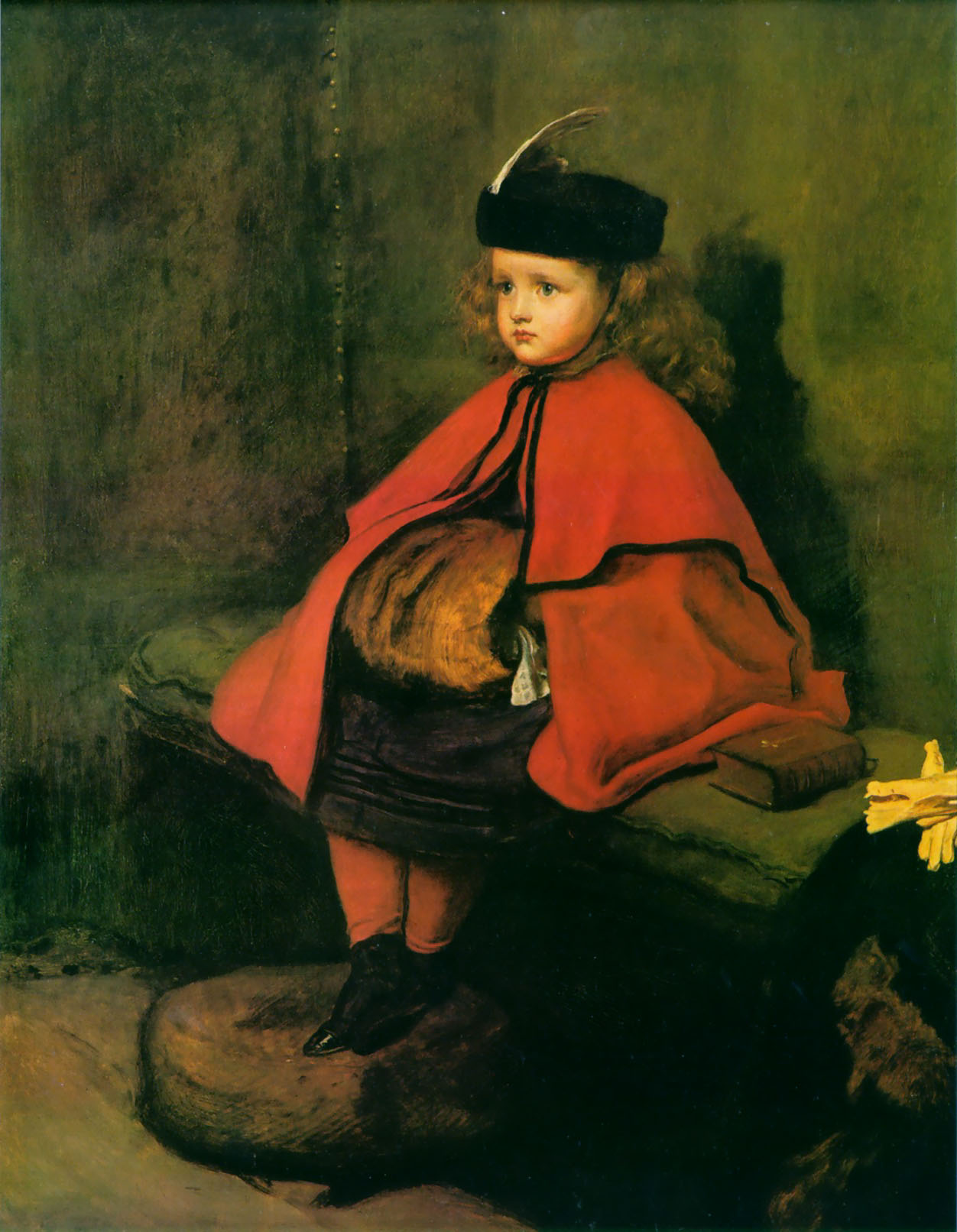
My First Sermon by John Everett Millais

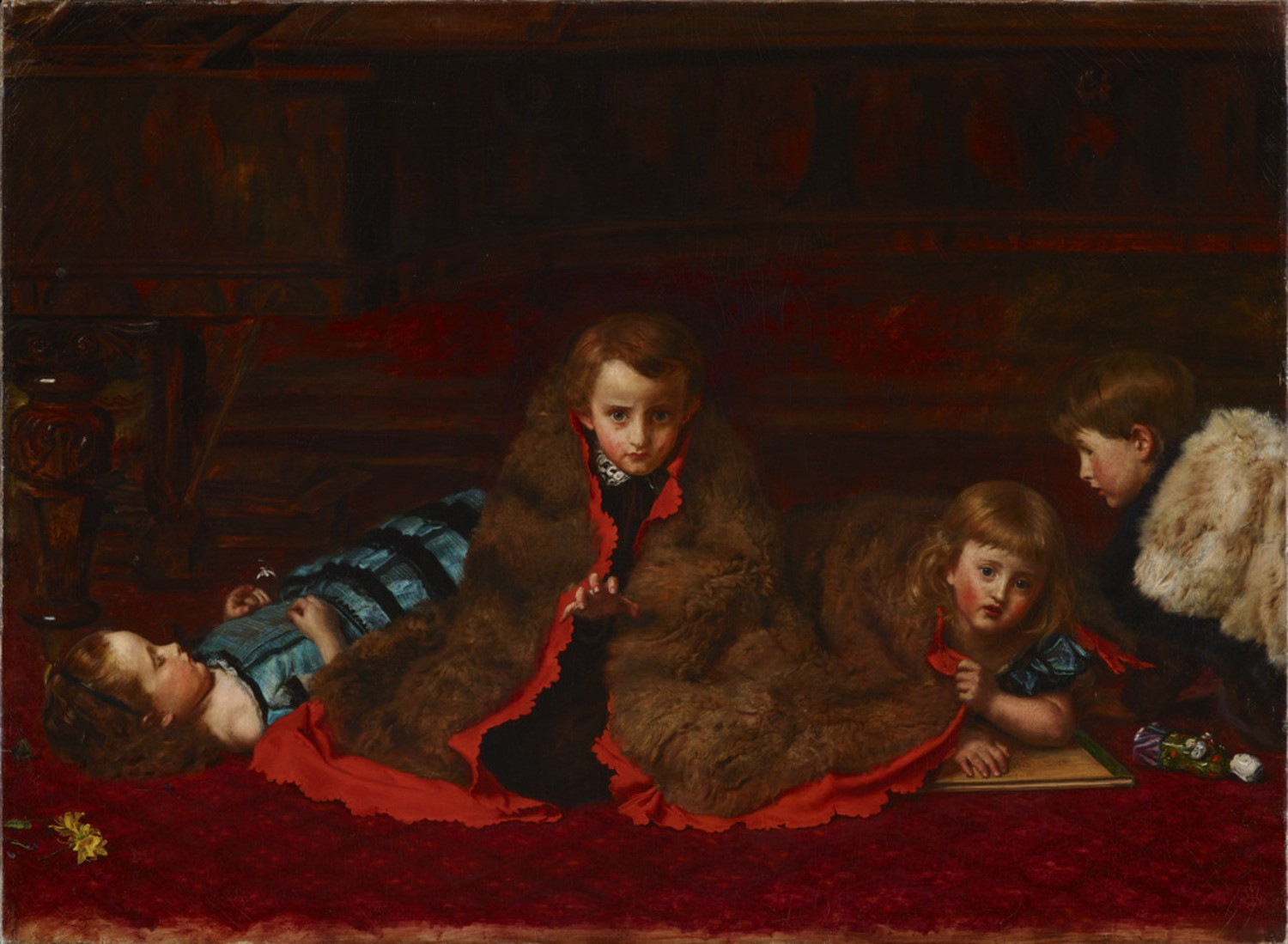
The Wolf's Den by John Everett Millais

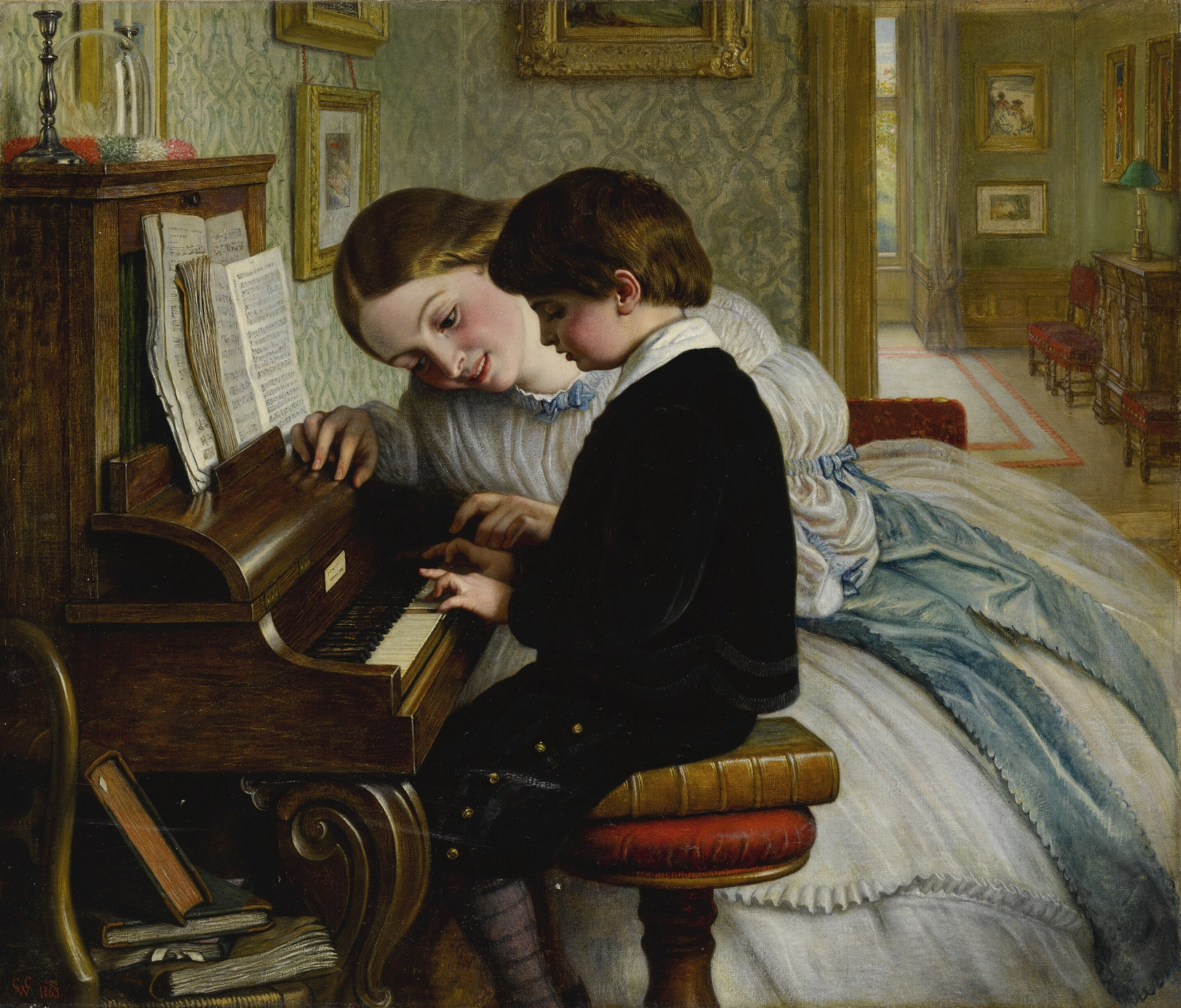
The First Music Lesson by Charles West Cope

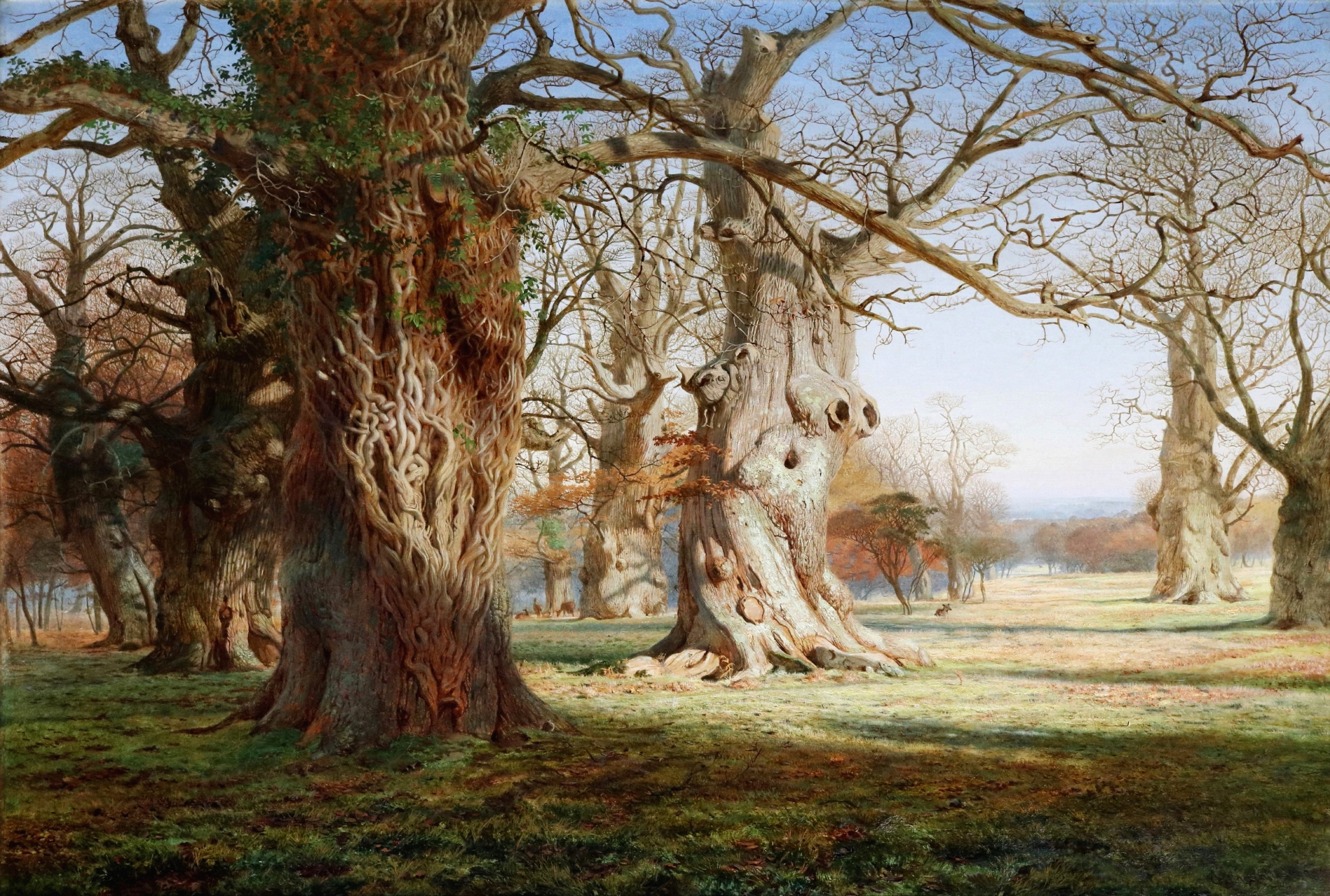
The Oaks of Cranbourne Chase, Windsor Forest by Andrew MacCallum

Agua Bendita by John Phillip

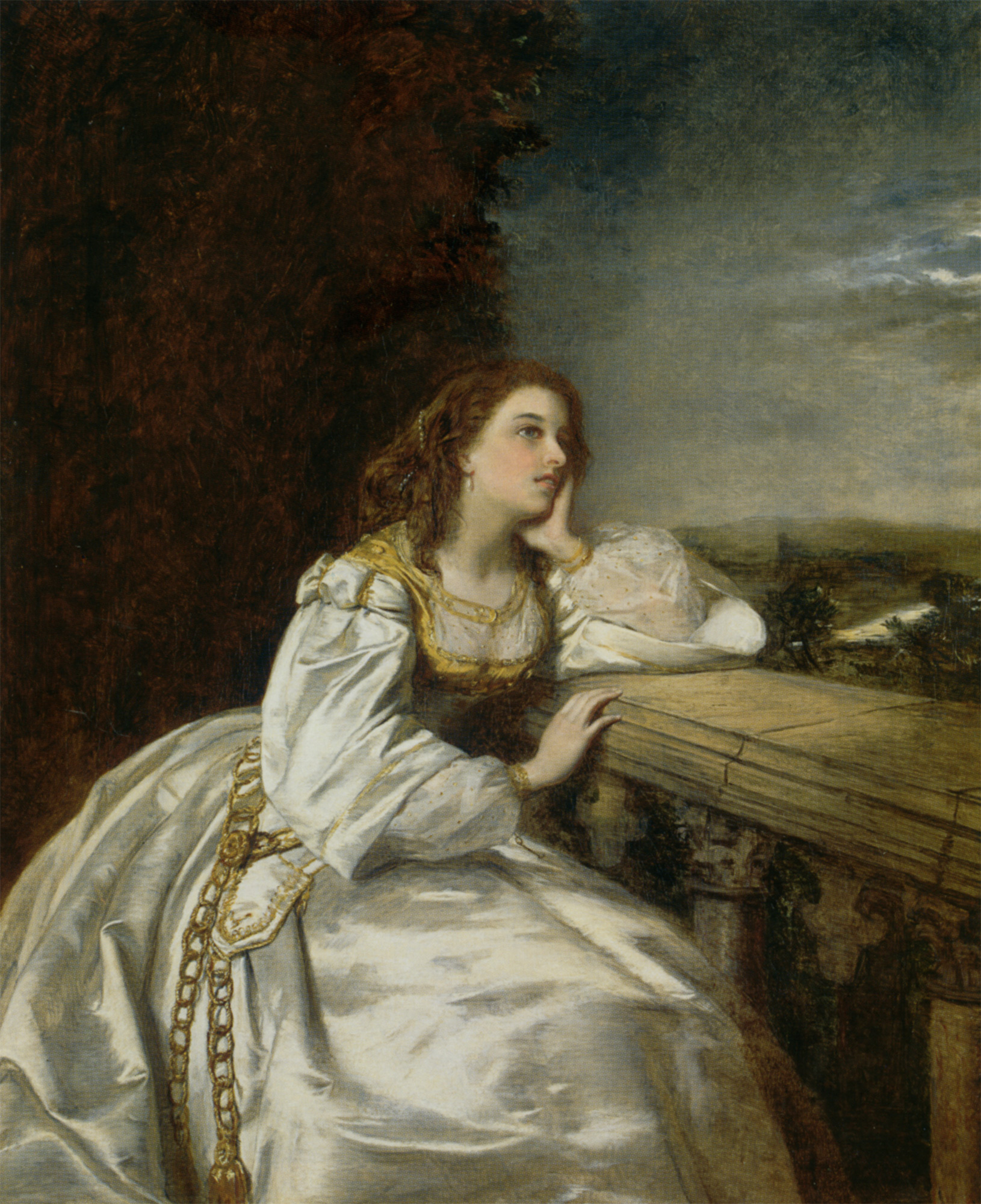
Juliet by William Powell Frith

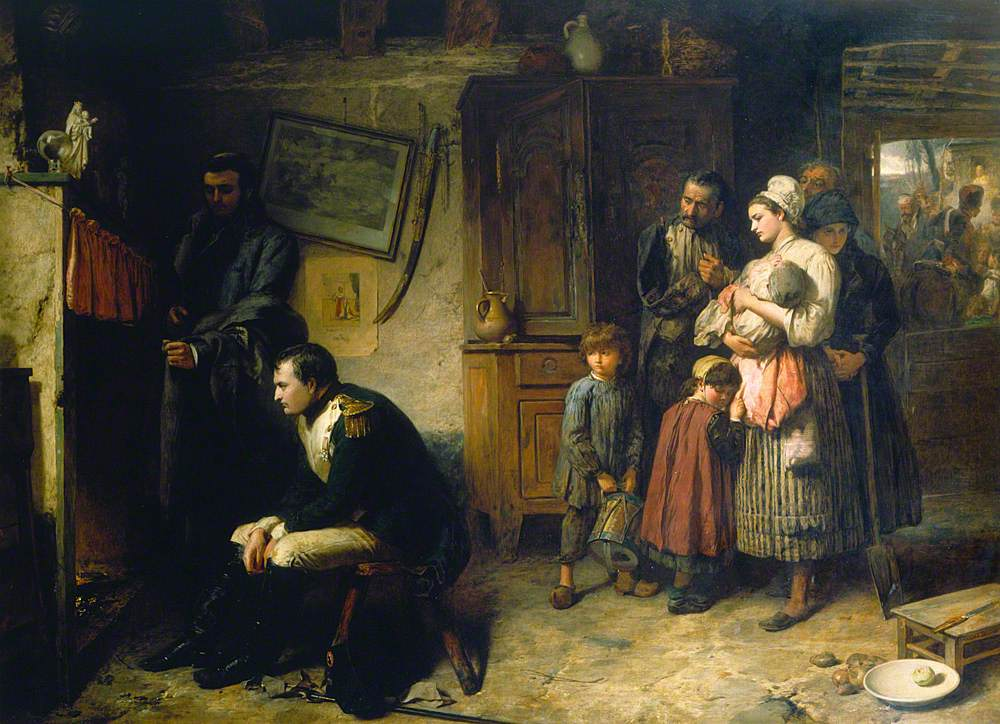
On the Road from Waterloo to Paris by Marcus Stone

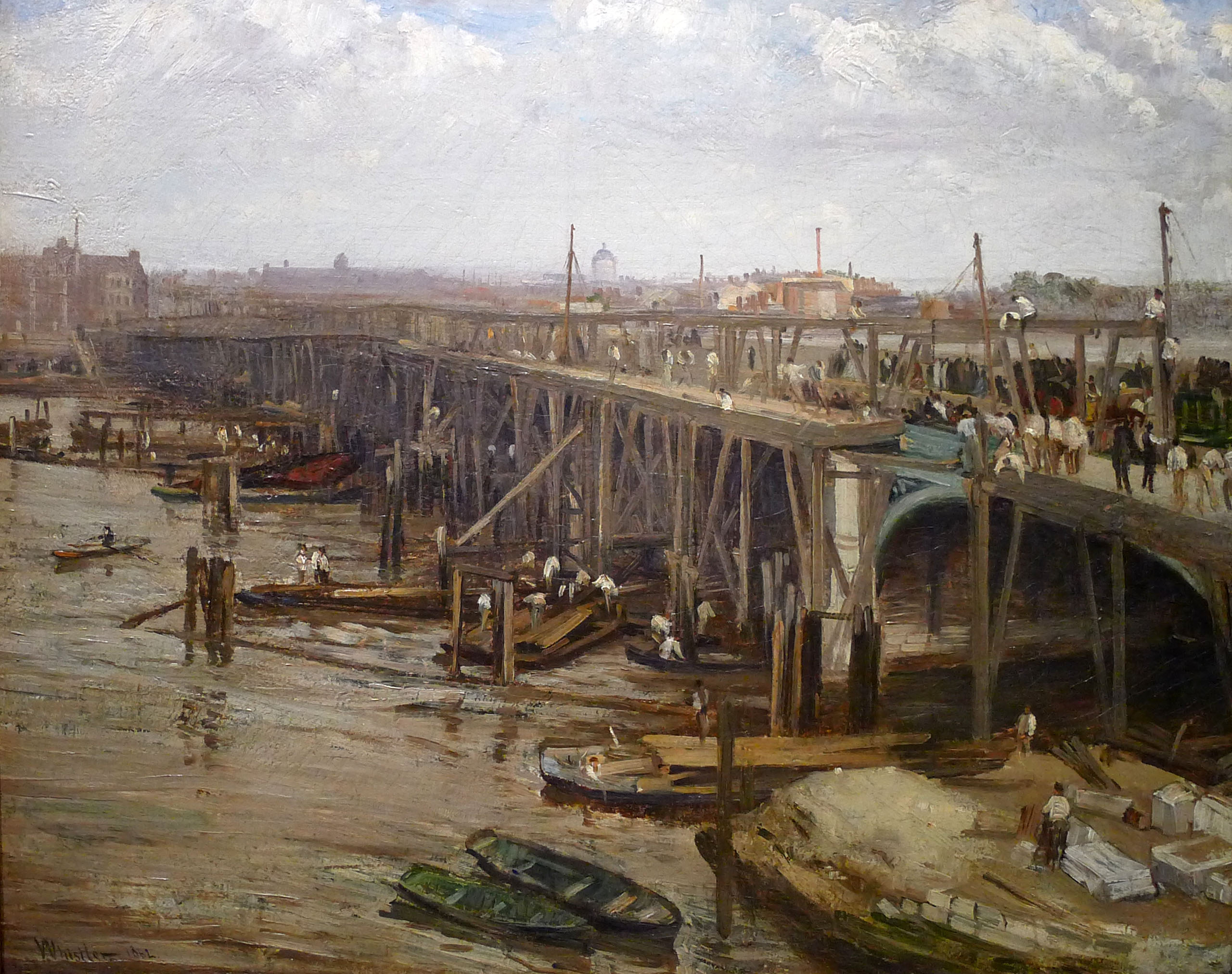
The Last of Old Westminster by James McNeill Whistler

The Morning after Trafalgar by Clarkson Stanfield

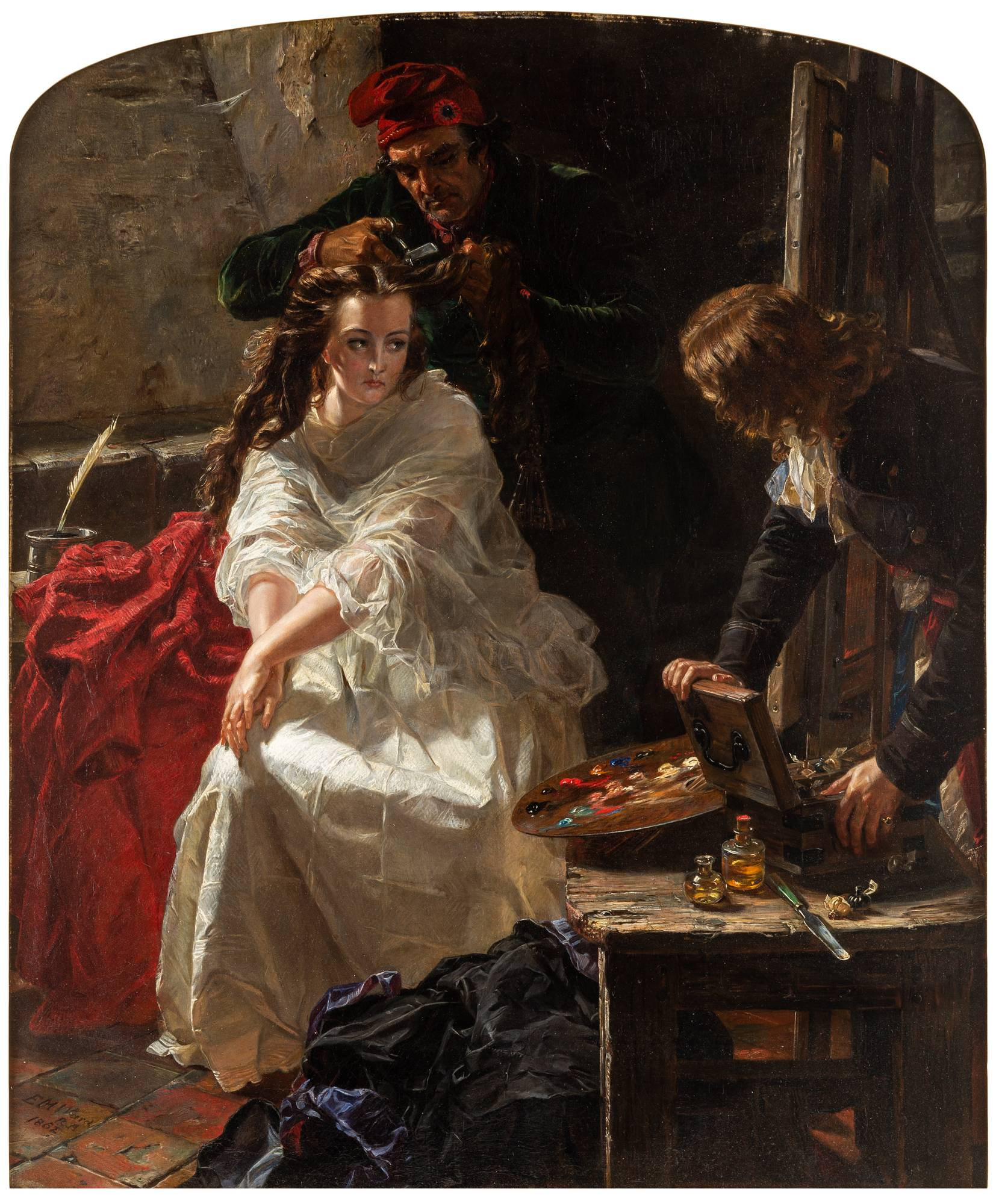
Charlotte Corday in the Prison of the Conciergerie by Edward Matthew Ward

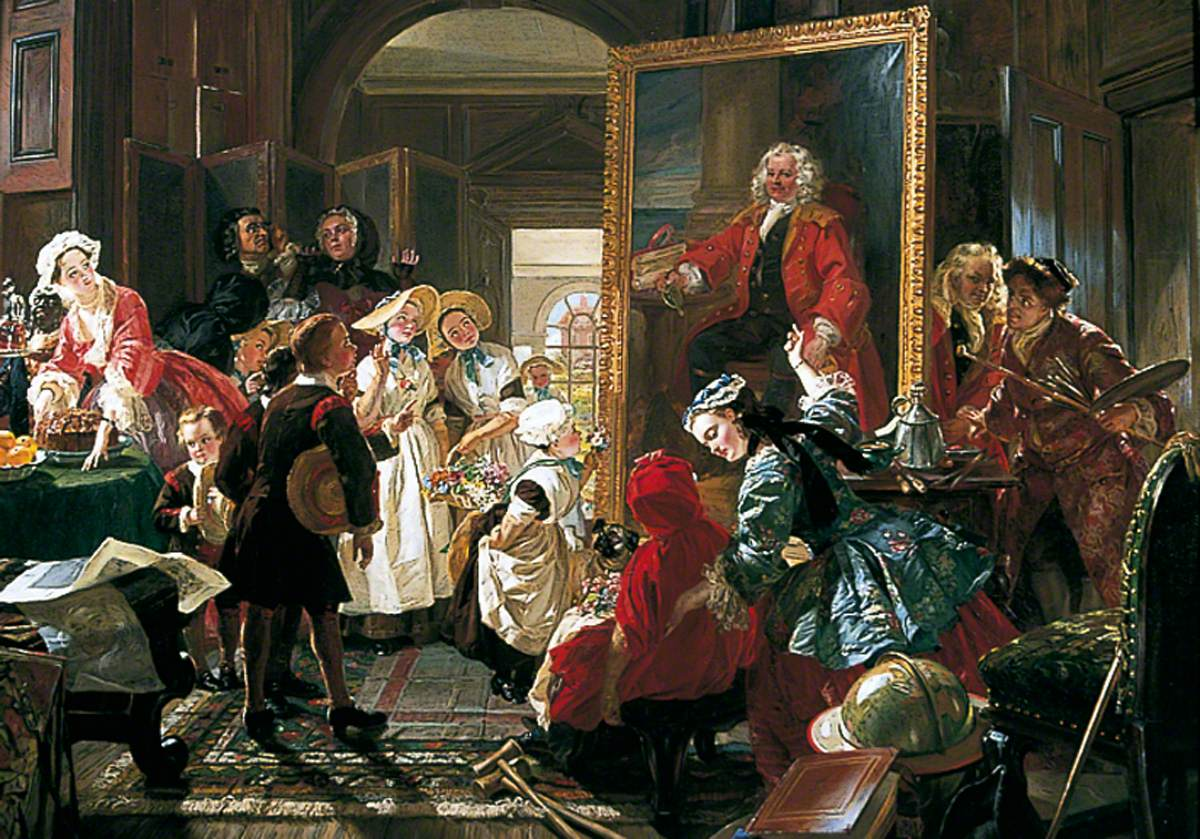
Hogarth's Studio in 1739 by Edward Matthew Ward

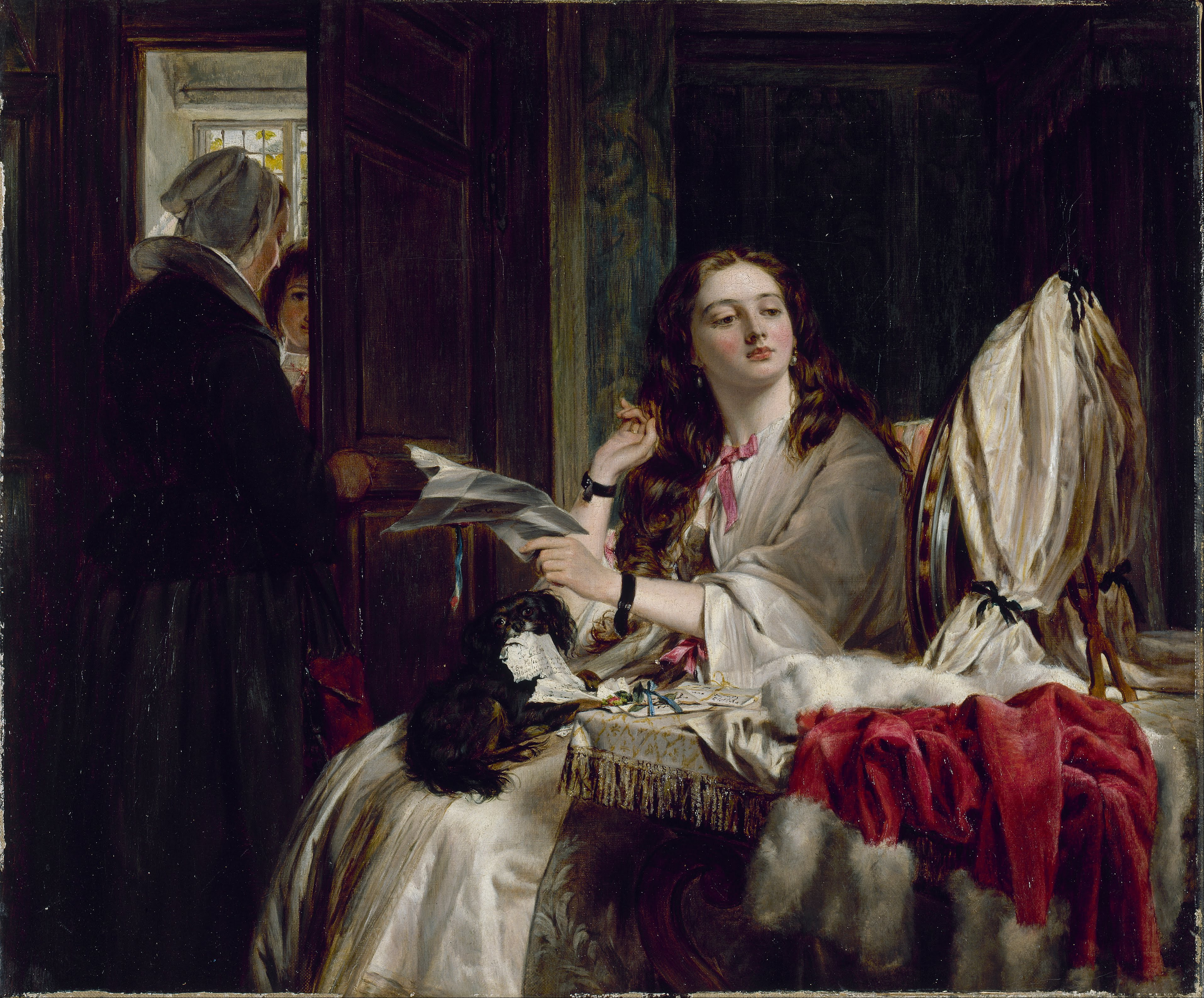
The Morning of St Valentine by John Callcott Horsley

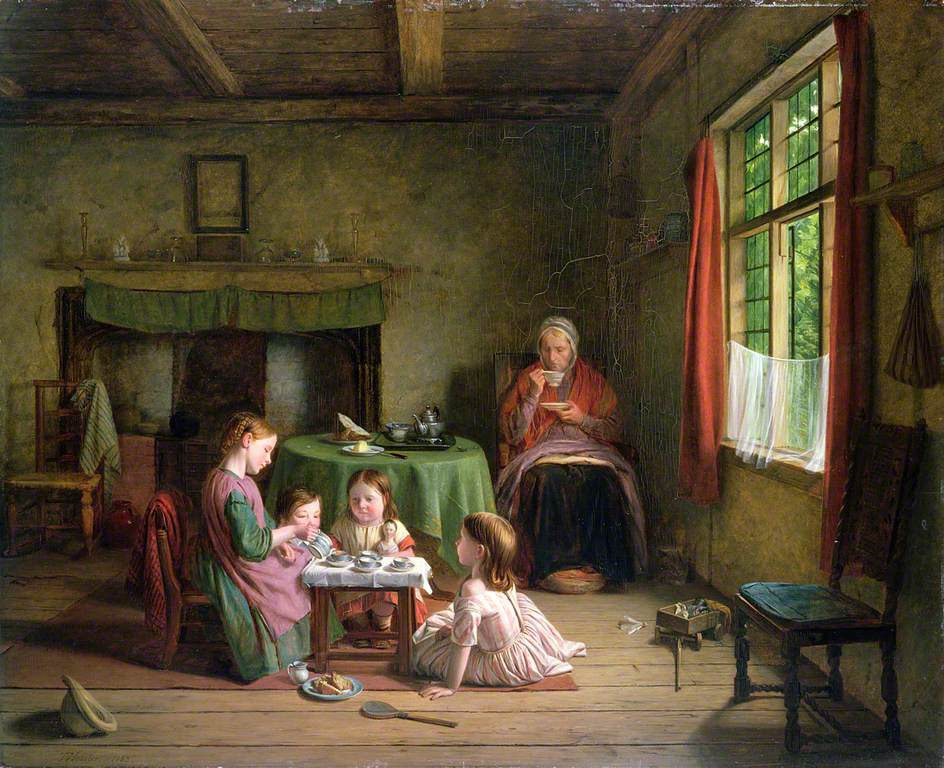
A Tea Party by Thomas Webster

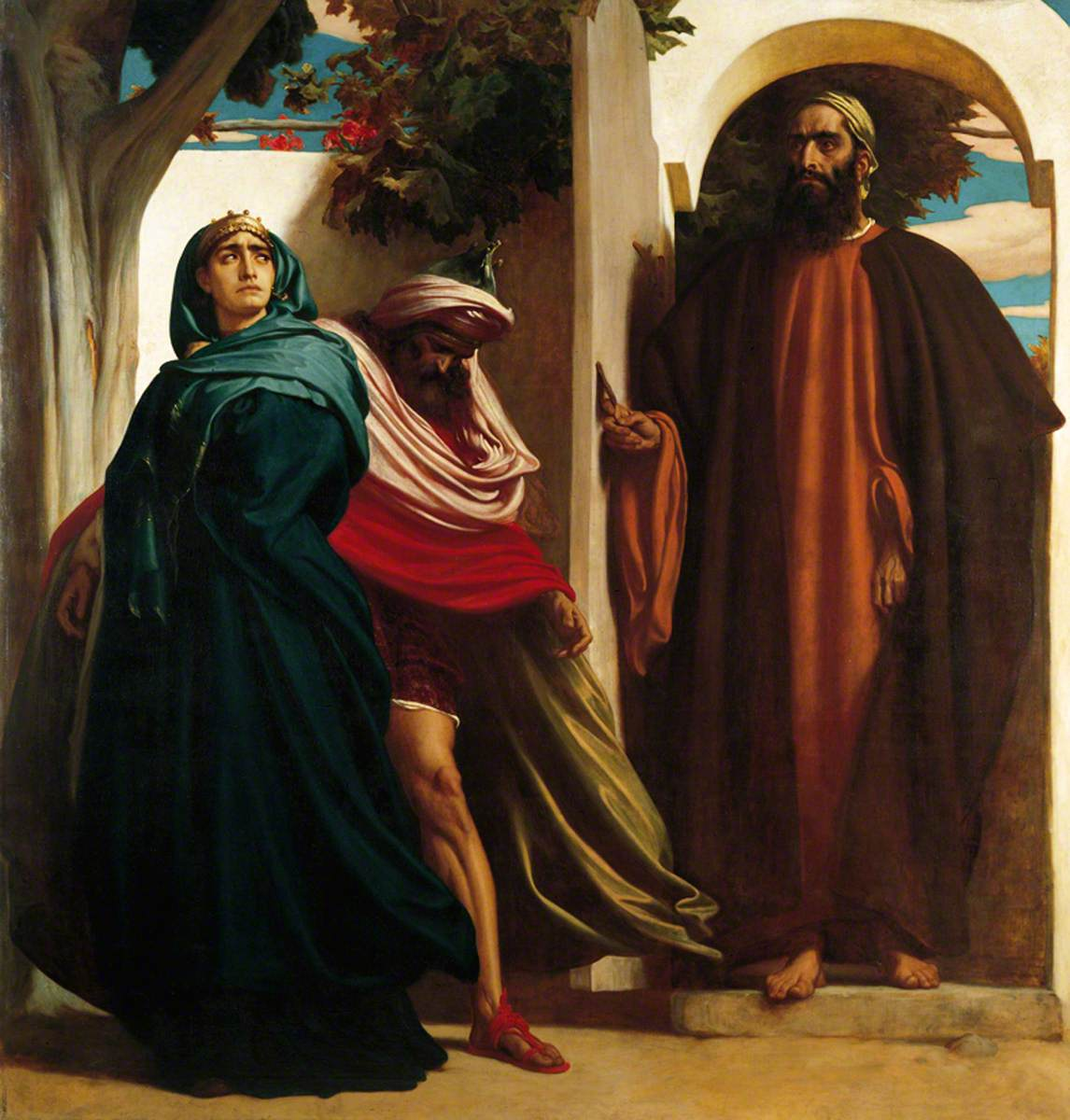
Jezebel and Ahab by Frederic Leighton

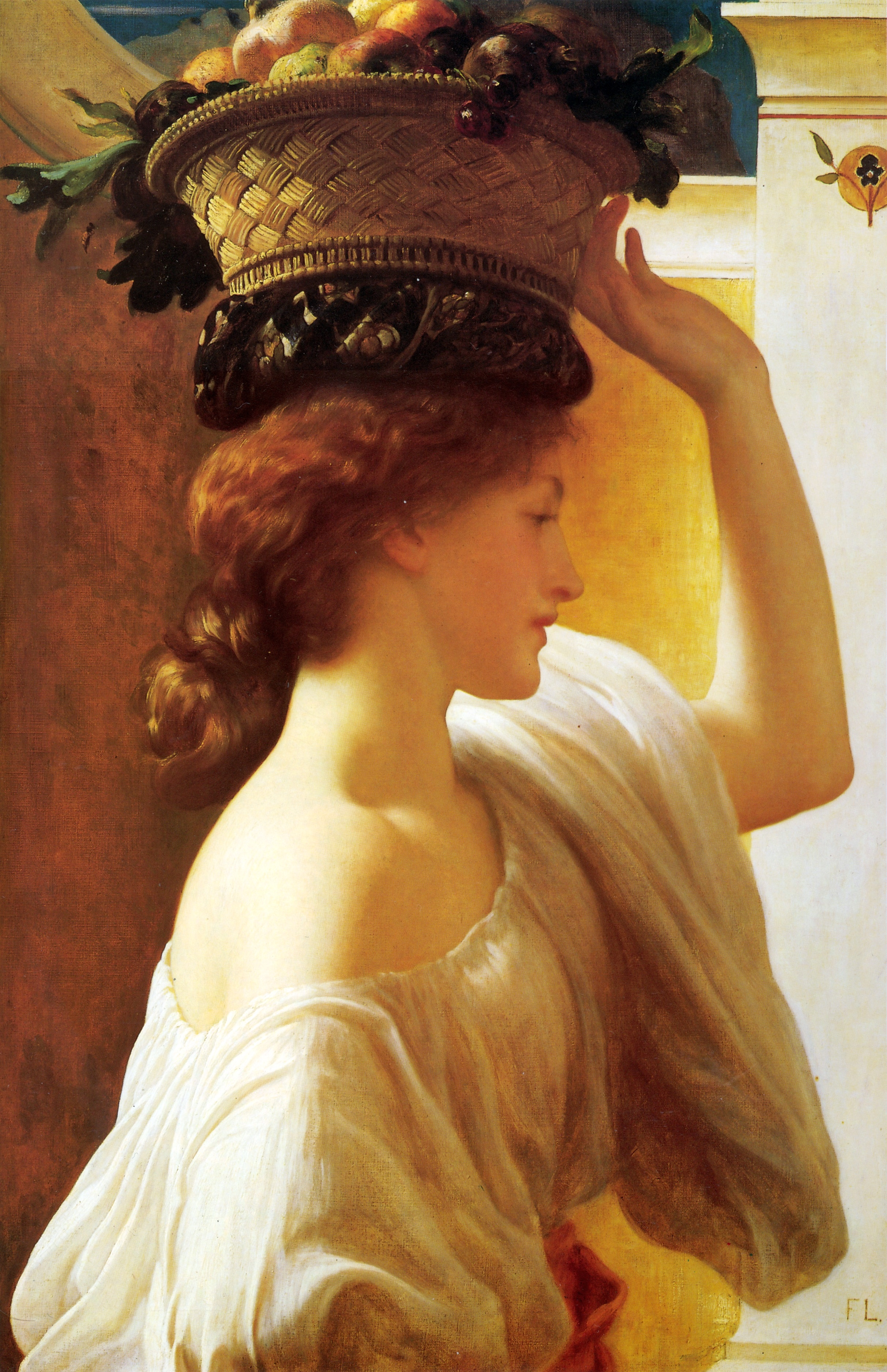
A Girl with a Basket of Fruit by Frederic Leighton

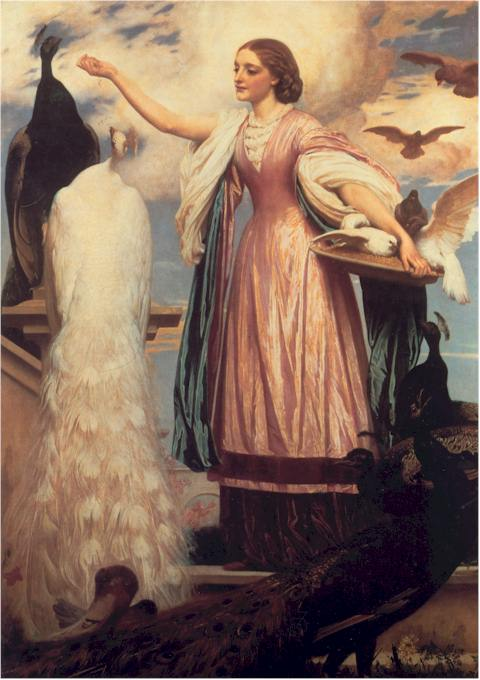
A Girl Feeding Peacocks by Frederic Leighton

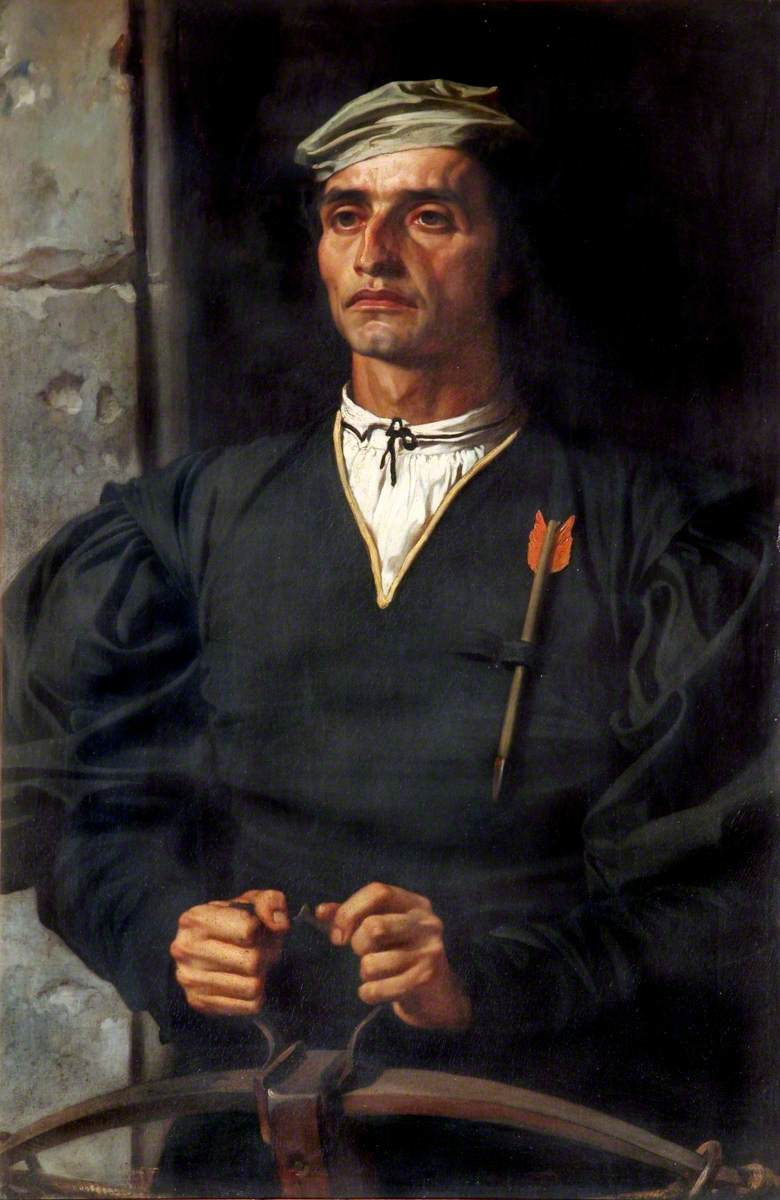
An Italian Crossbow Man by Frederic Leighton

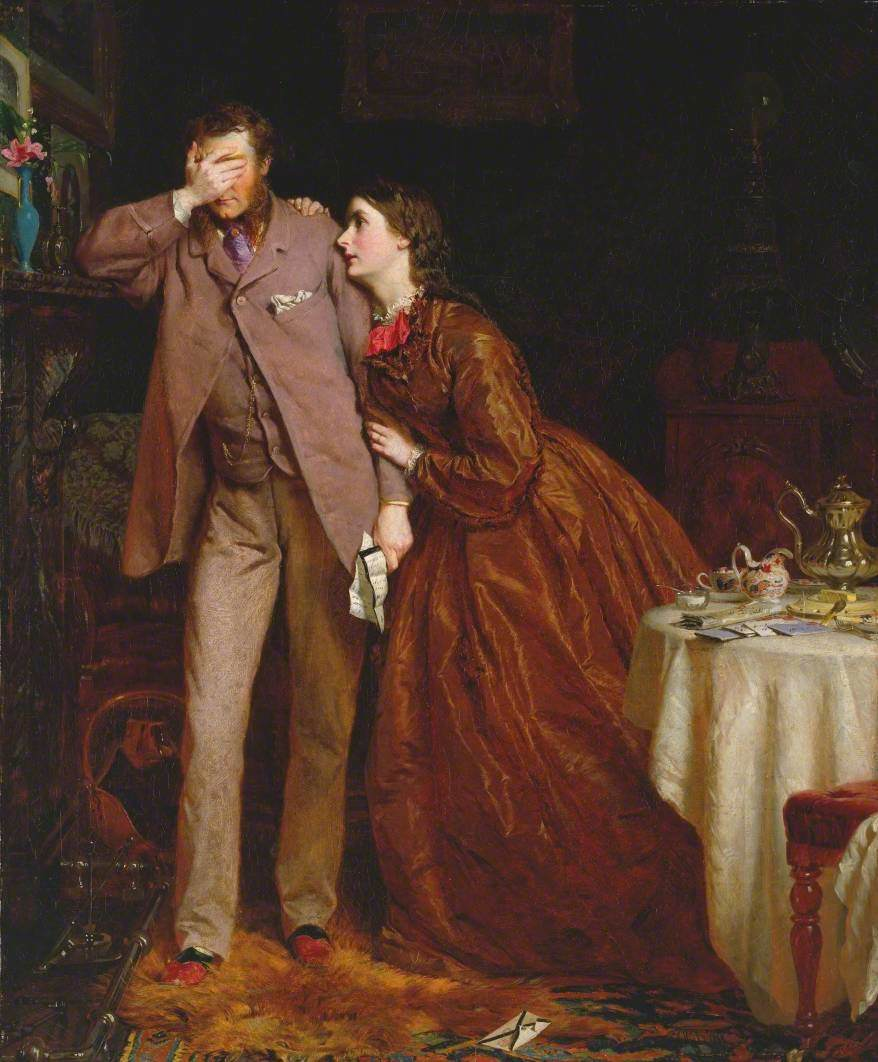
Woman's Mission, Companion of Manhood by George Elgar Hicks

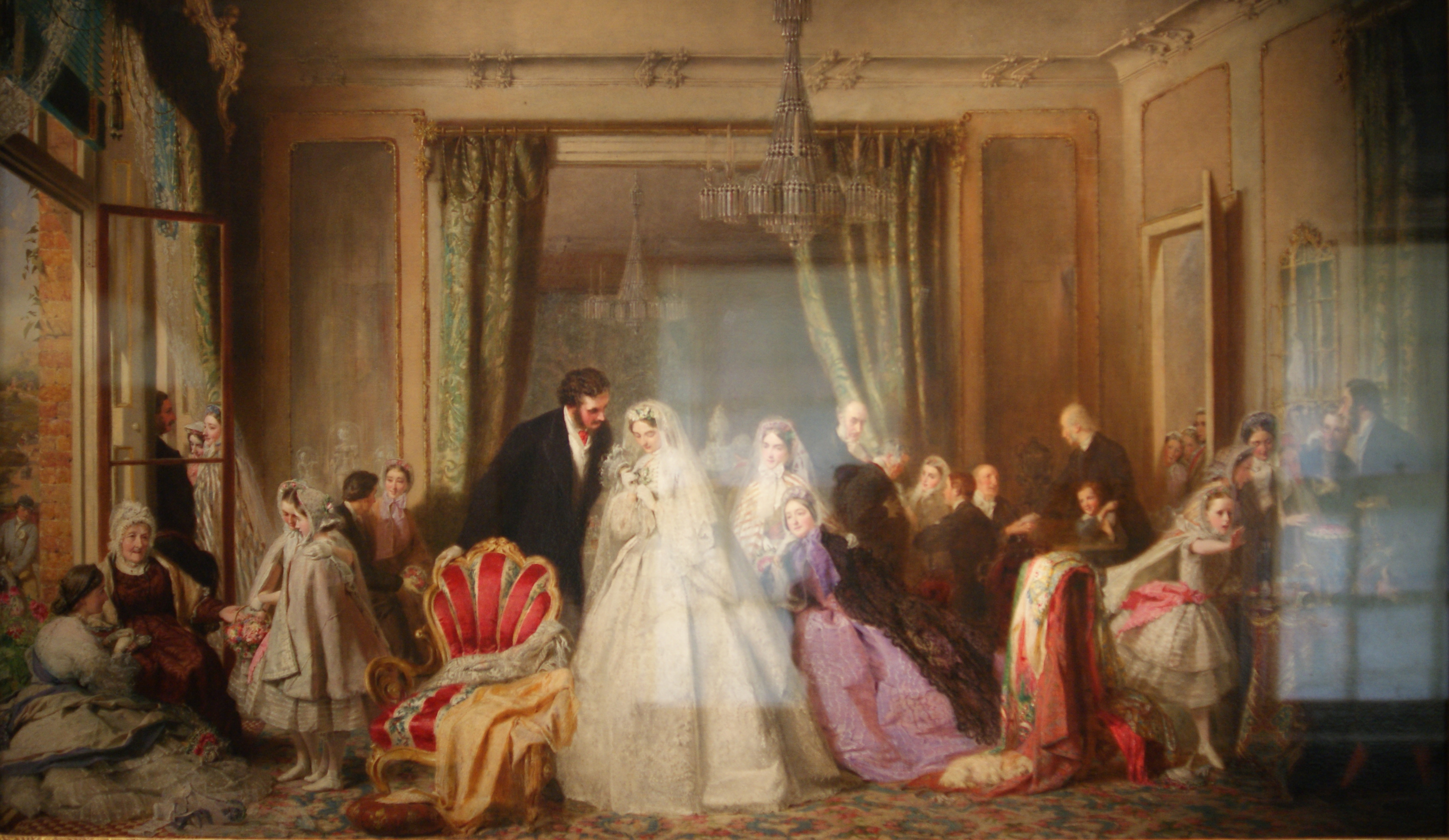
Changing Homes by George Elgar Hicks

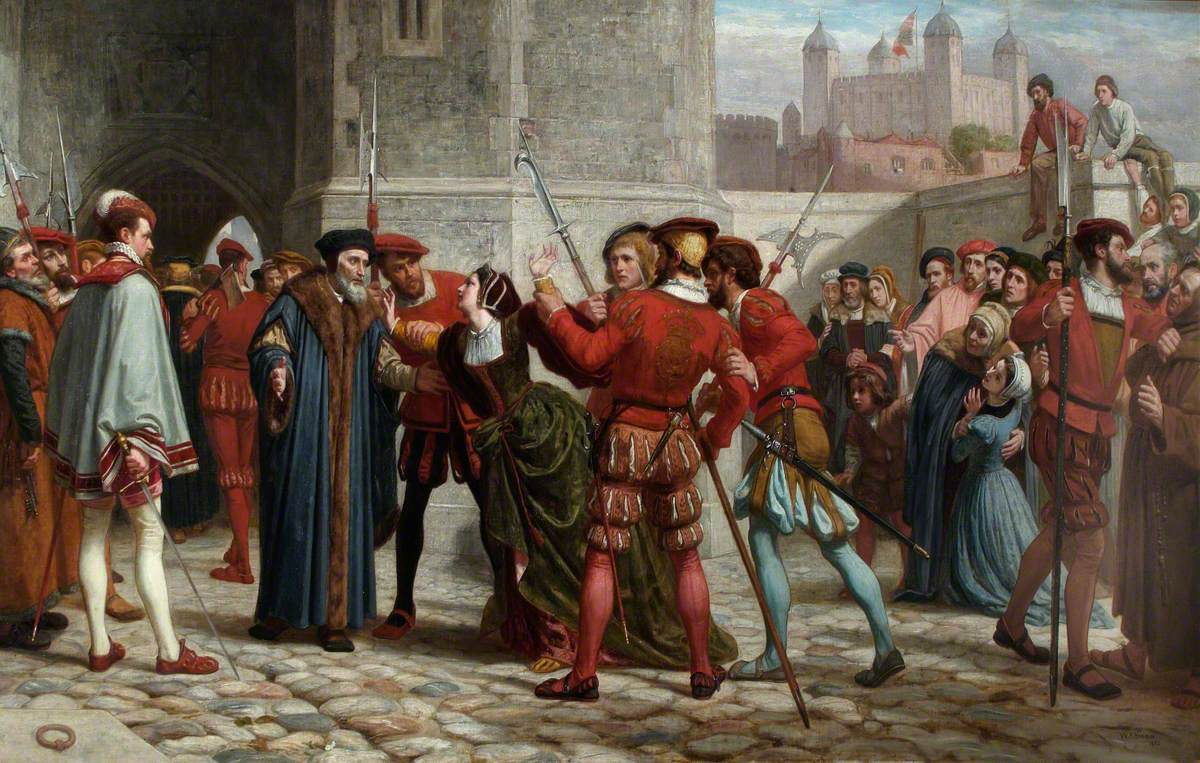
The Meeting of Thomas More with His Daughter by William Frederick Yeames

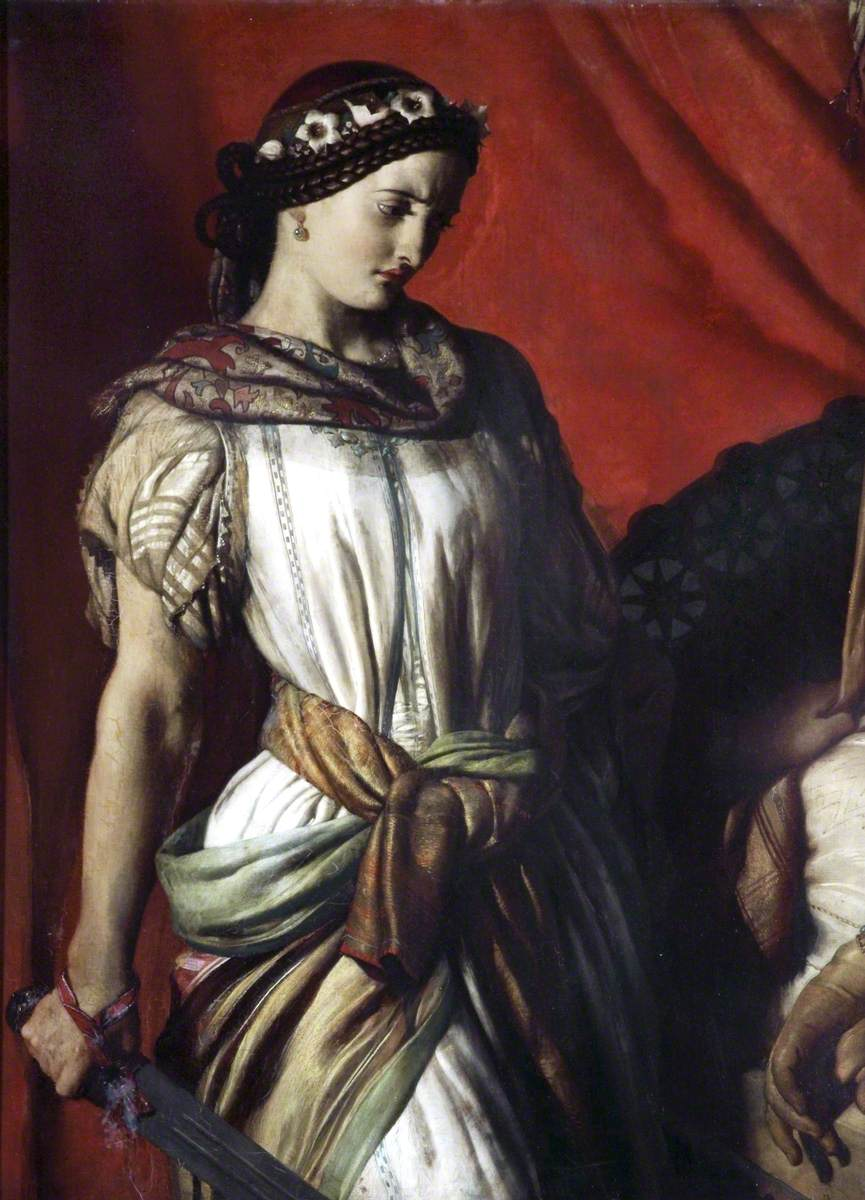
Judith and Holofernes by John Rogers Herbert

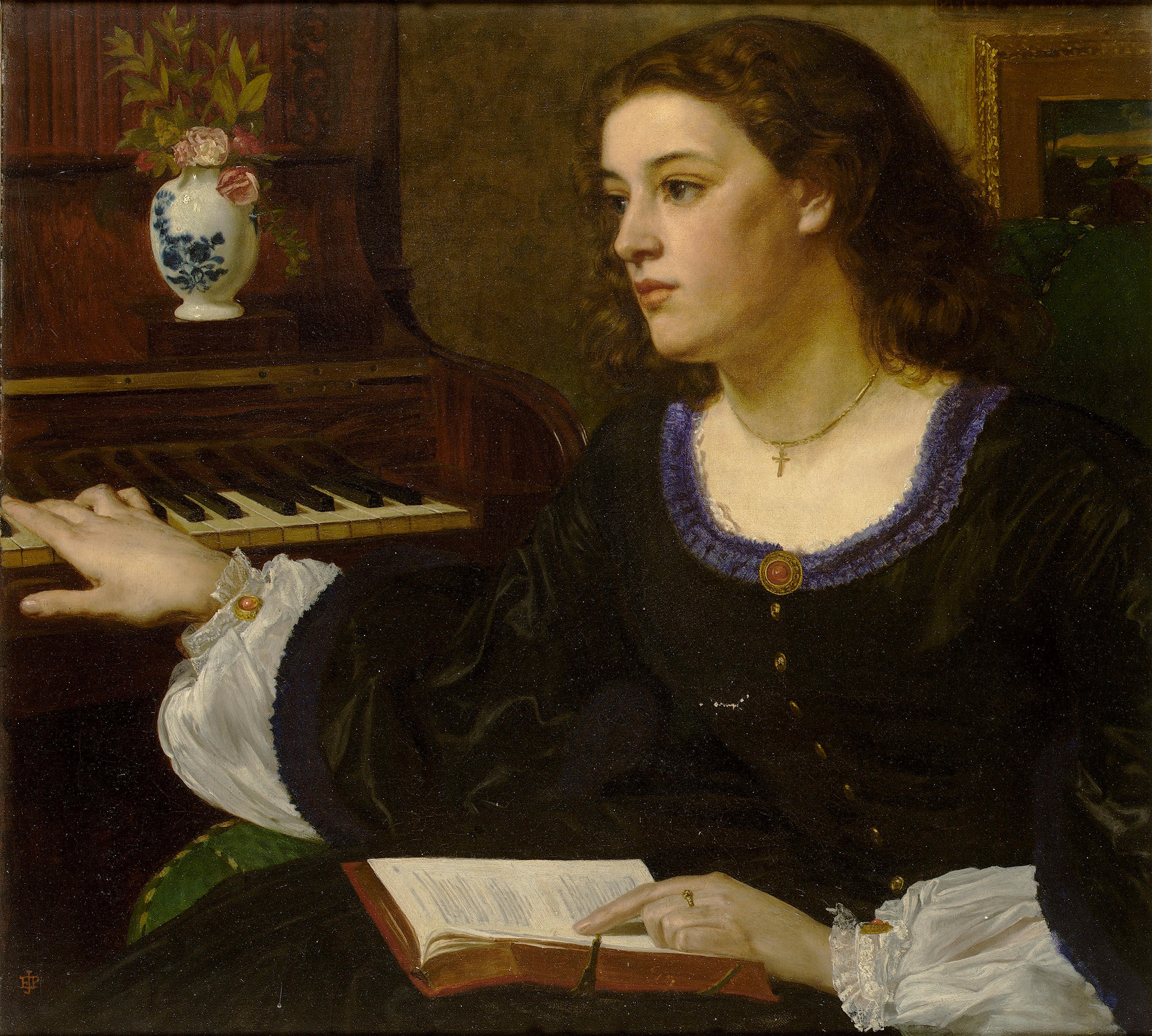
A Day Dream by Edward Poynter

Lucrezia Borgia by Alfred Elmore

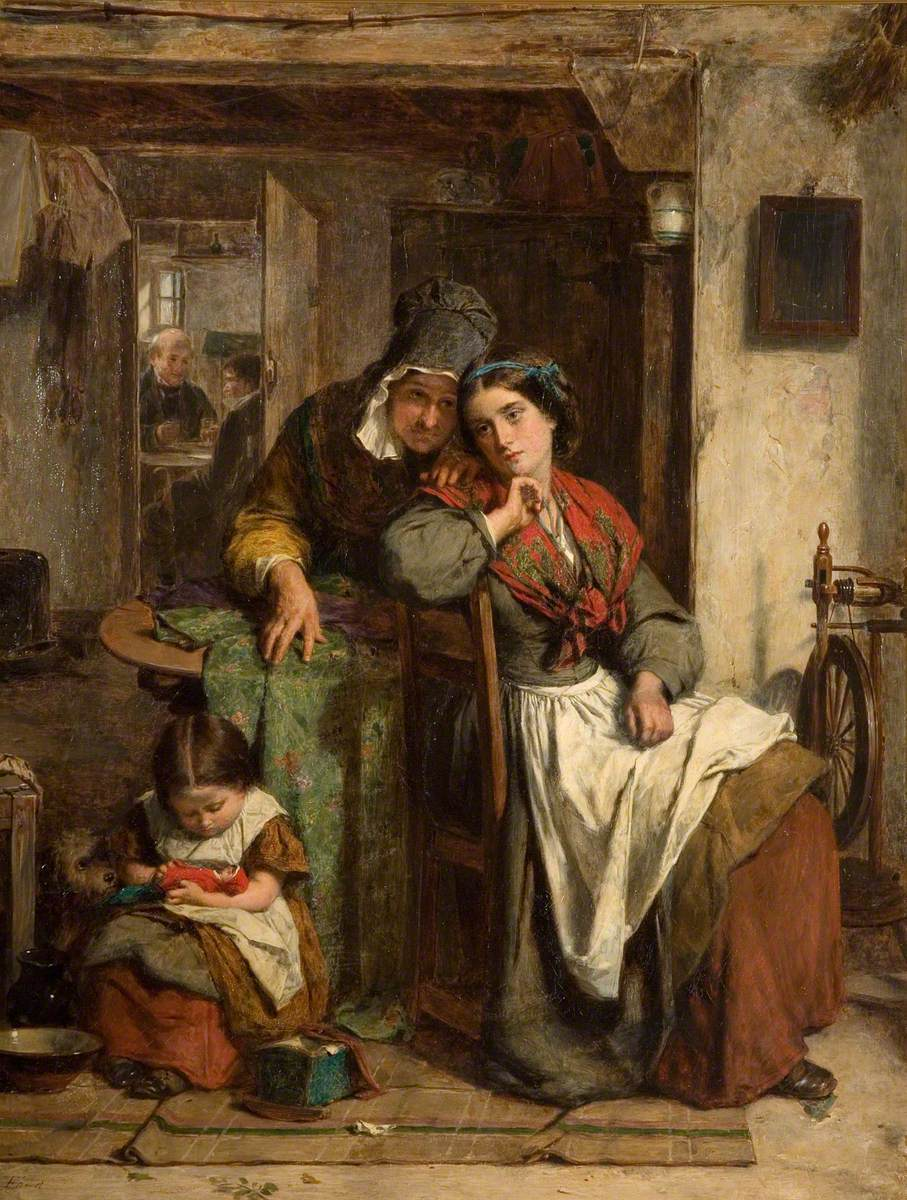
The Silken Gown by Thomas Faed

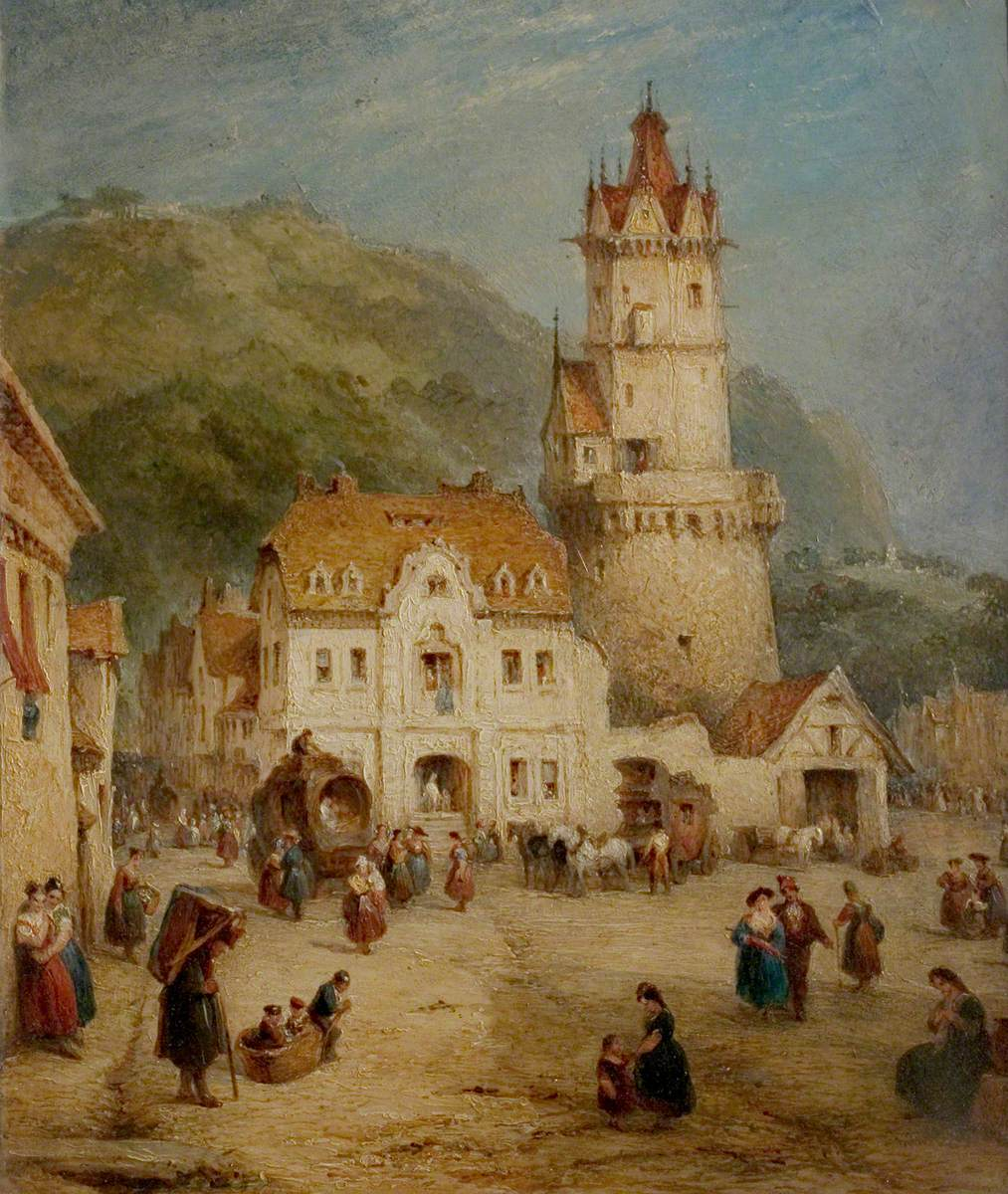
Andernach by George Jones

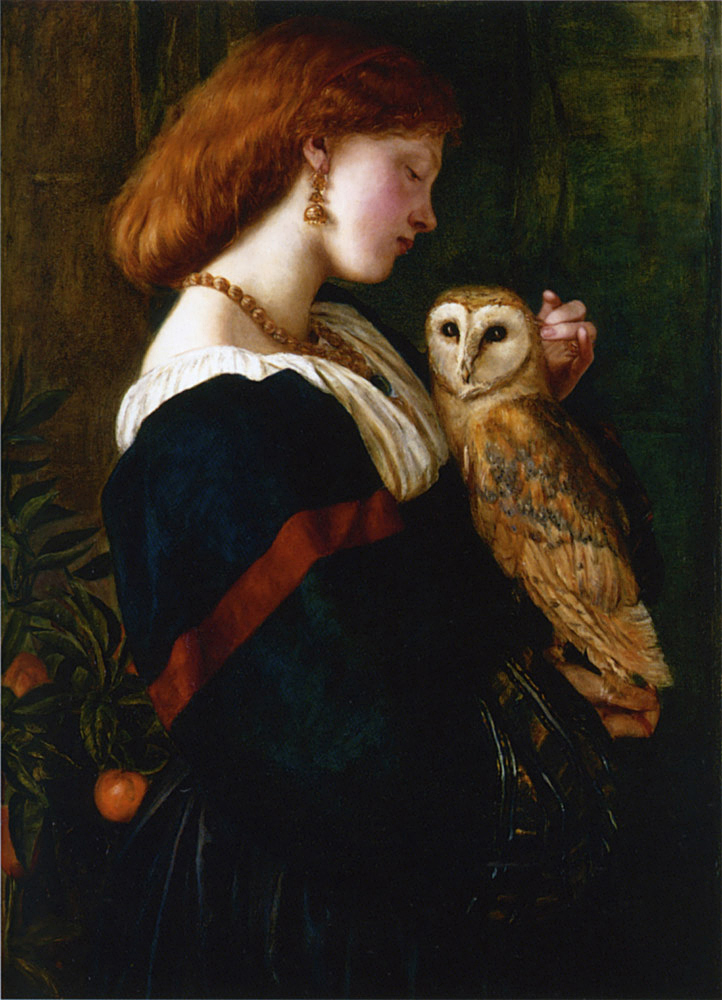
Il Barbagianni by Valentine Cameron Prinsep

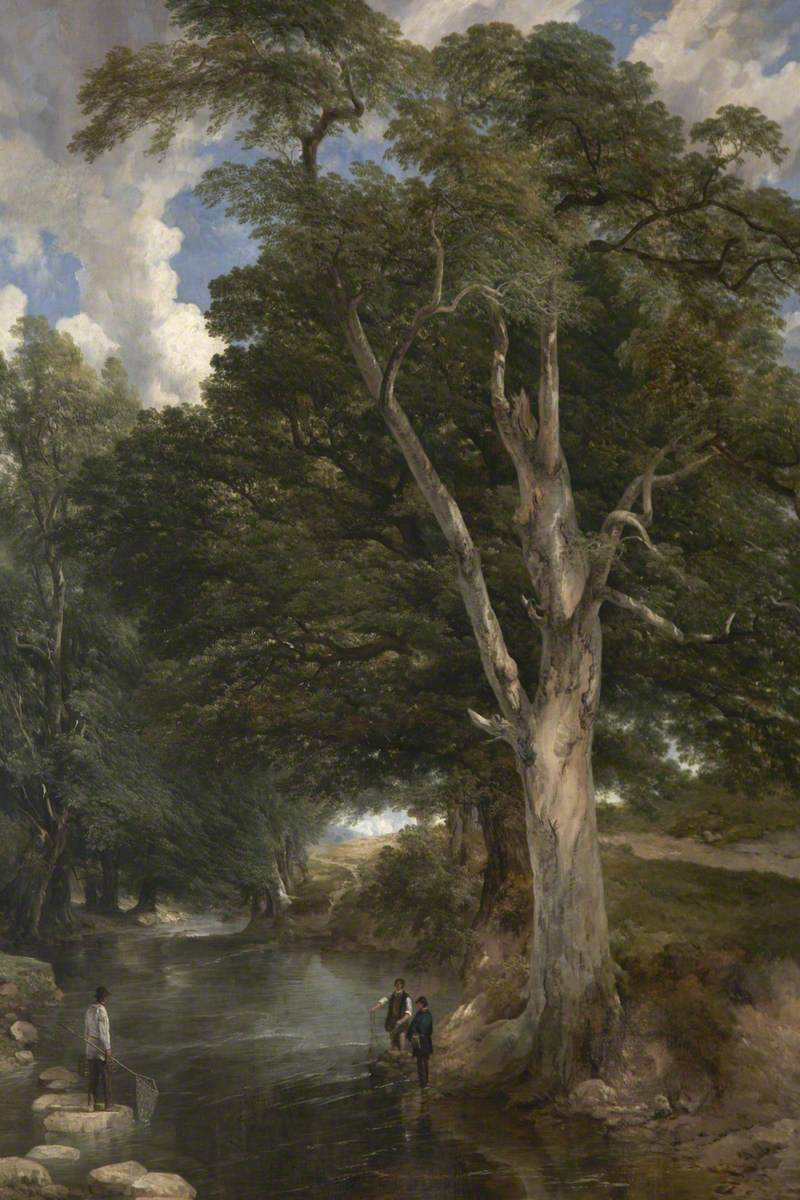
Where the Trout Lies by Frederick Richard Lee

My Lady and Her Children by John Callcott Horsley

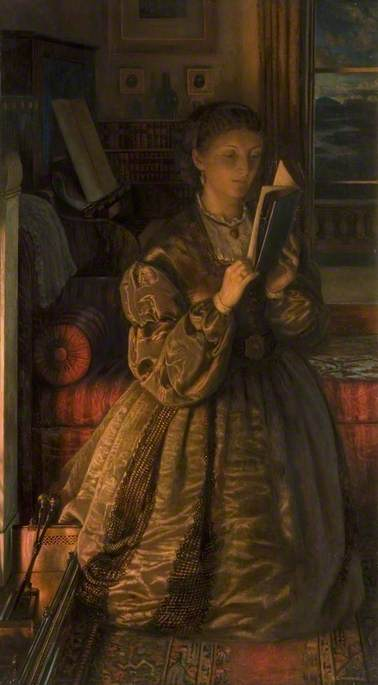
The Last Chapter by Robert Braithwaite Martineau

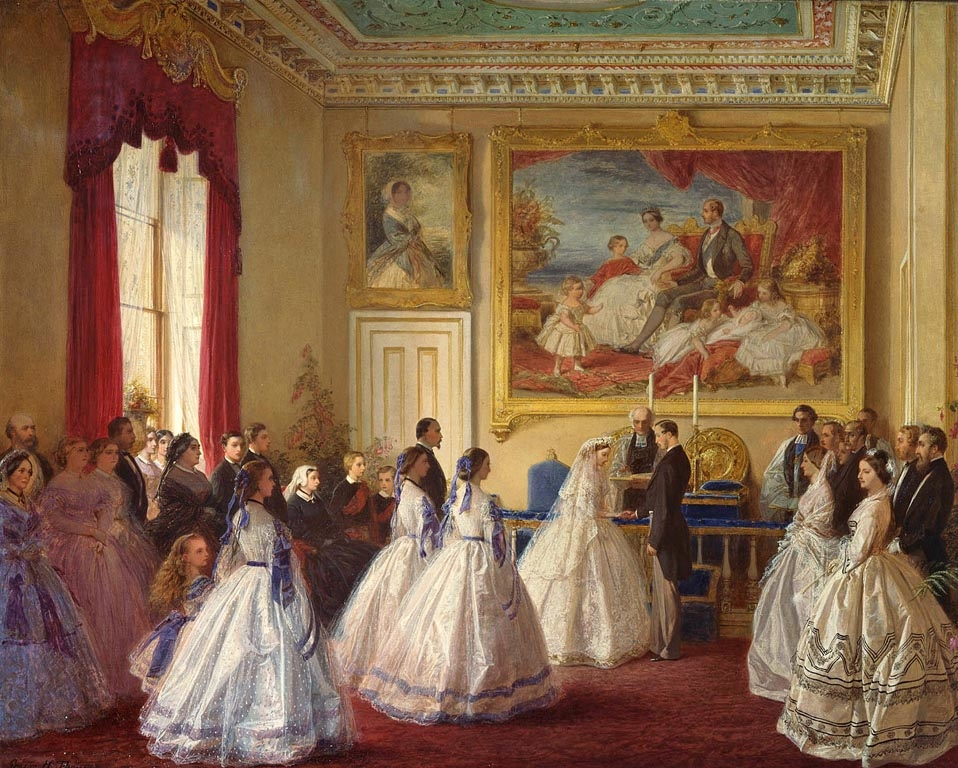
The Marriage of Princess Alice by George Housman Thomas

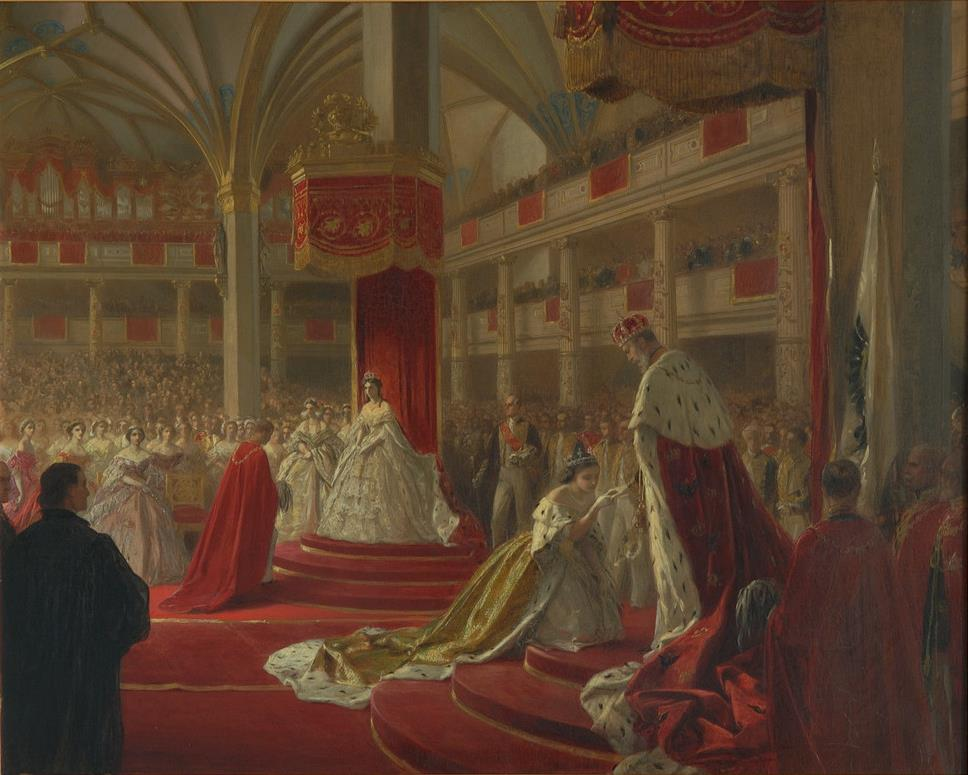
The Coronation of the King of Prussia by George Housman Thomas

A Frank Encampment in the Desert of Mount Sinai by John Frederick Lewis

The Census of 1861 by Charles Landseer

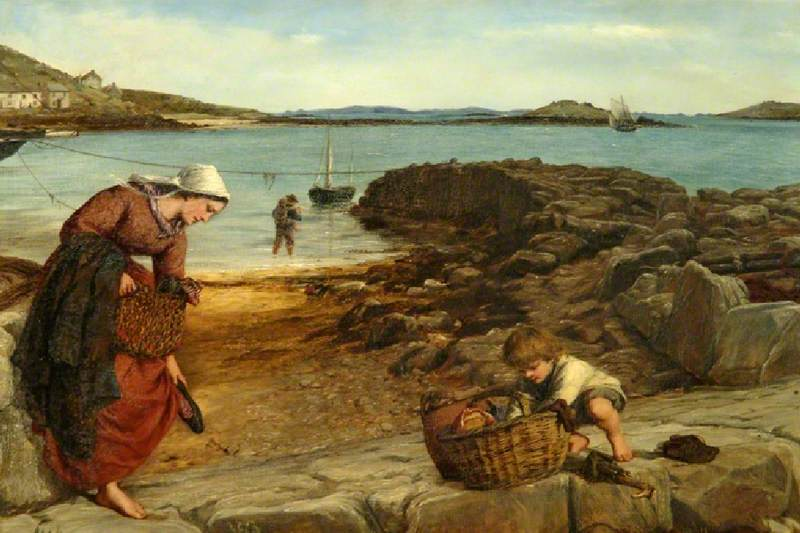
Leaving at Low Water by James Clarke Hook

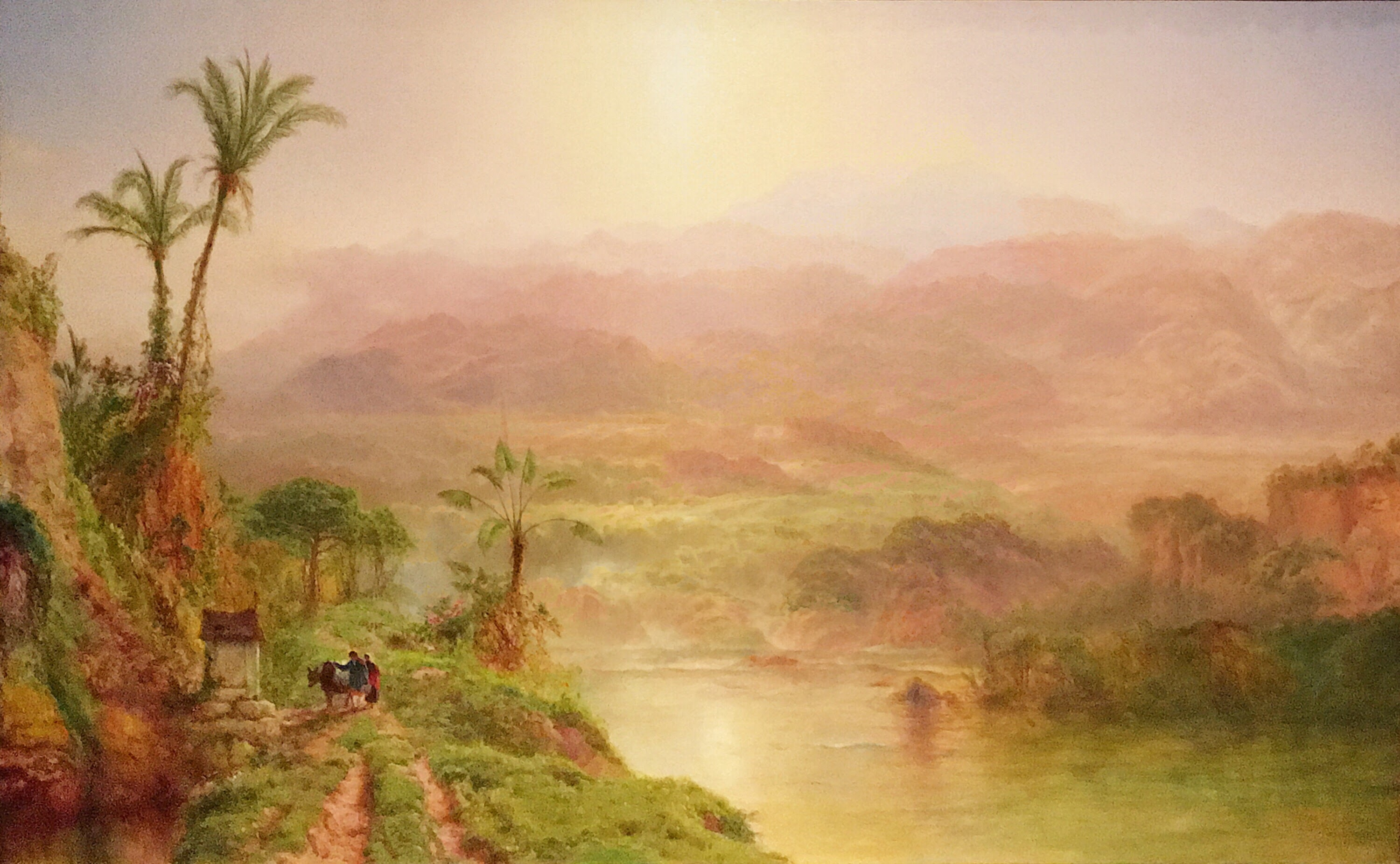
Lagoon of the Guayaquil River by Louis Remy Mignot

Lord Palmerston Addressing the House of Commons by John Phillip

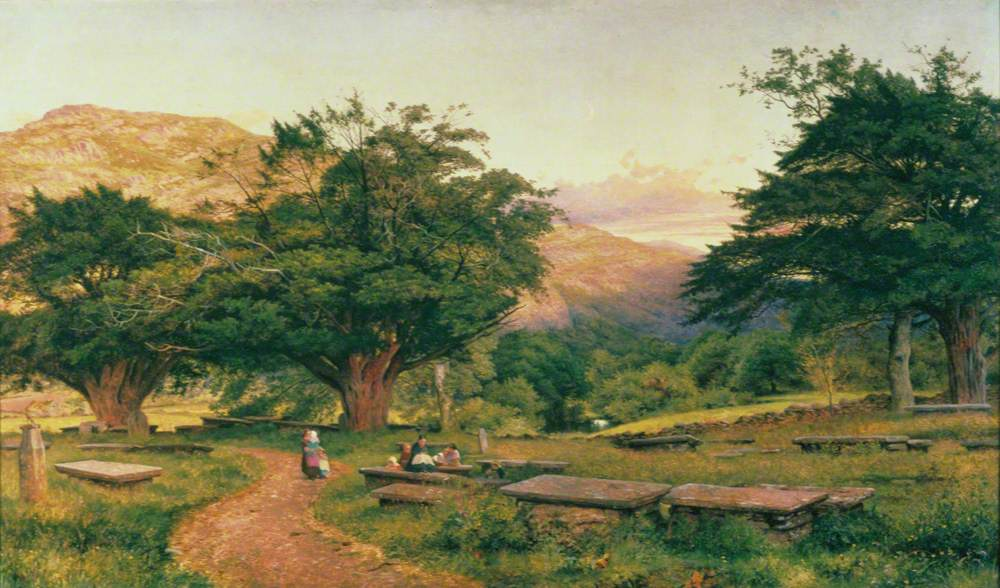
The Churchyard, Bettws-y-Coed by Benjamin Williams Leader

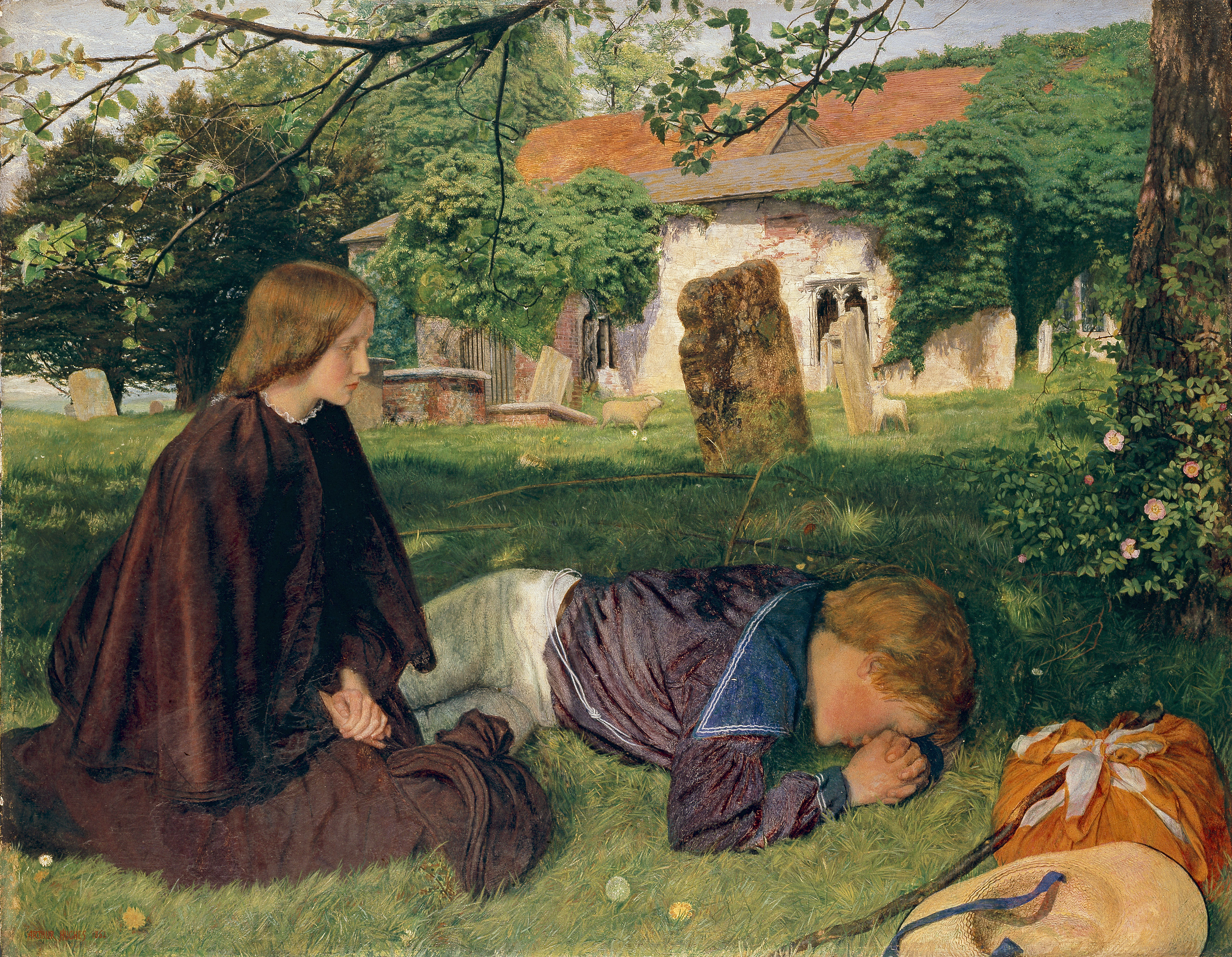
Home from the Sea by Arthur Hughes

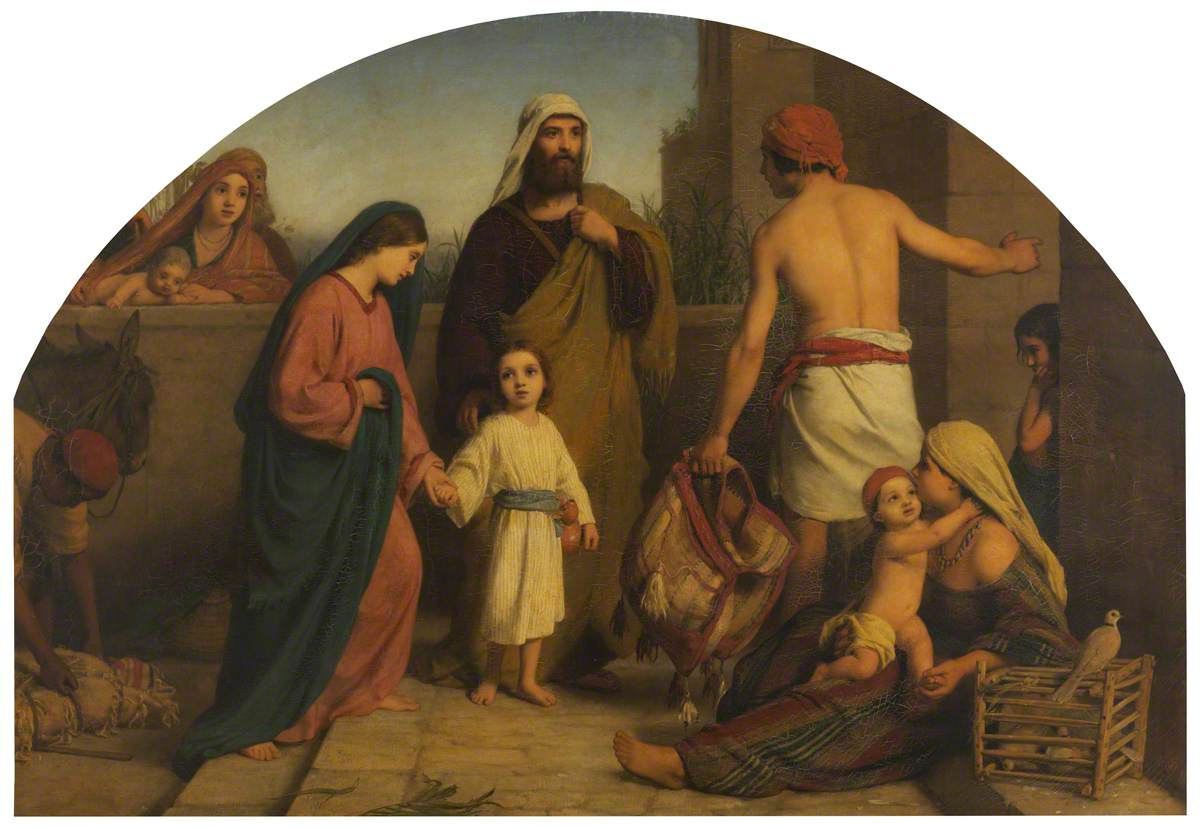
The Holy Family Returned from Egypt by William Charles Thomas Dobson

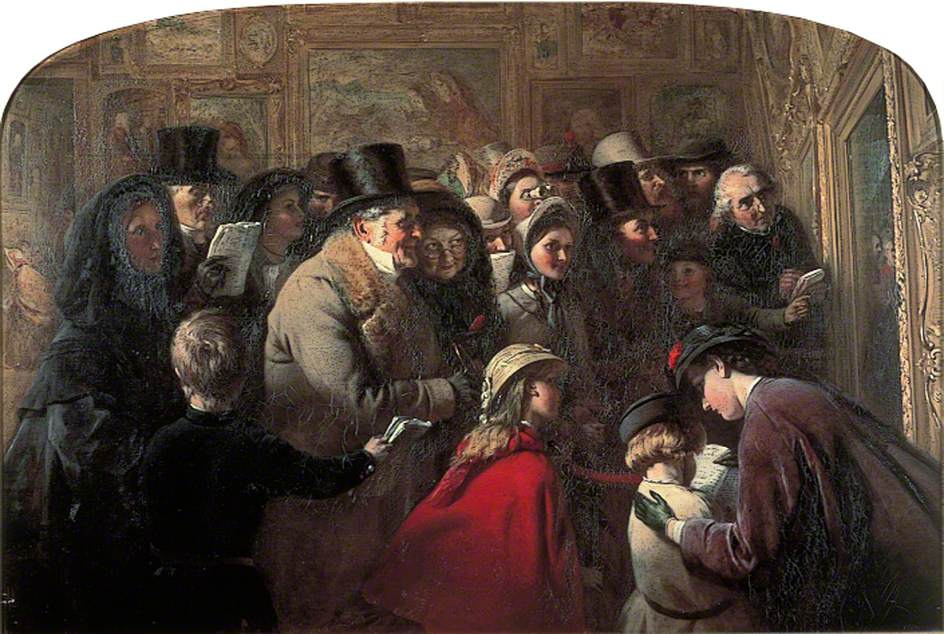
Public Opinion by George Bernard O'Neill

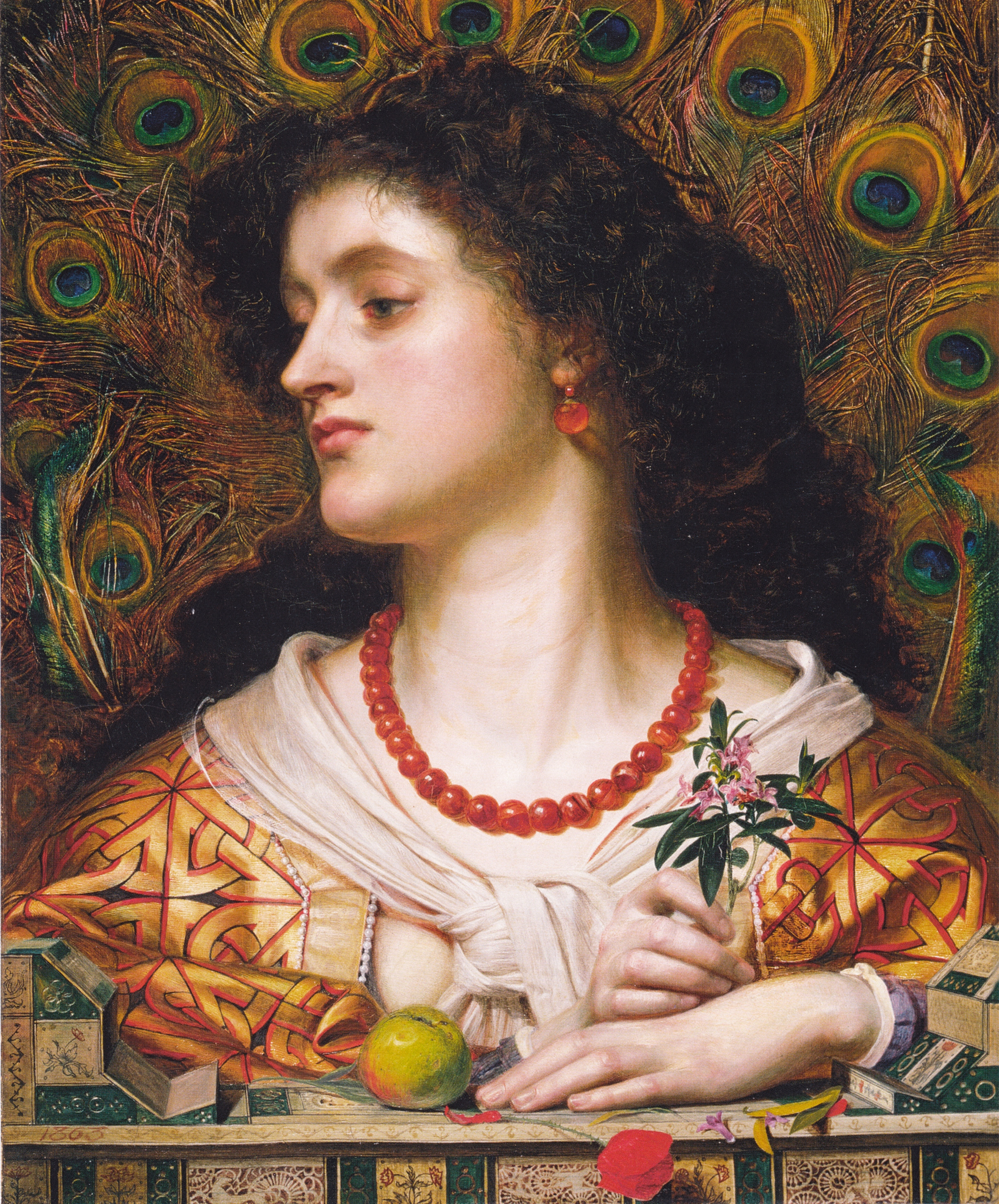
Vivien by Frederick Sandys

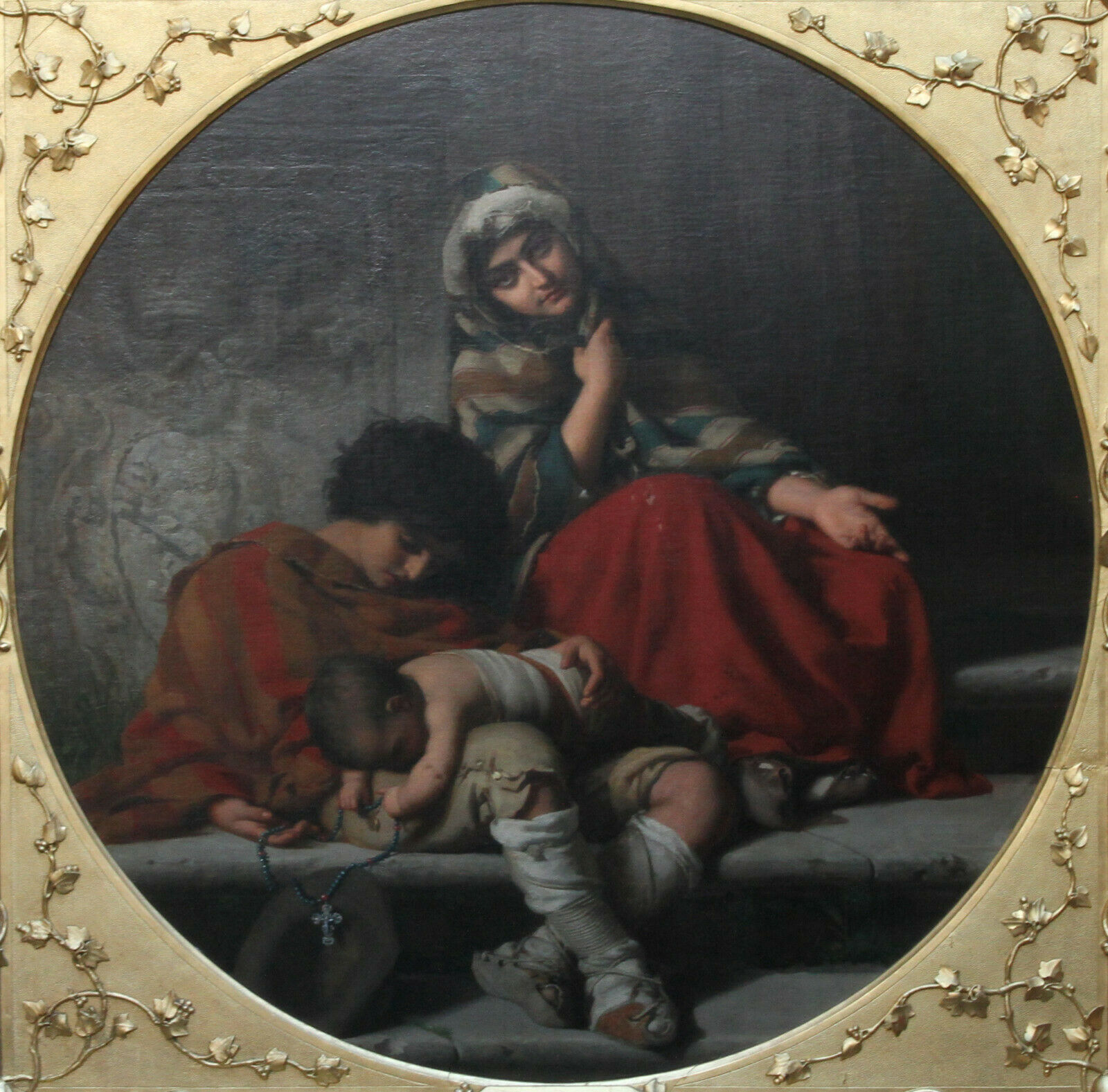
Roman Beggars by Rudolf Lehmann

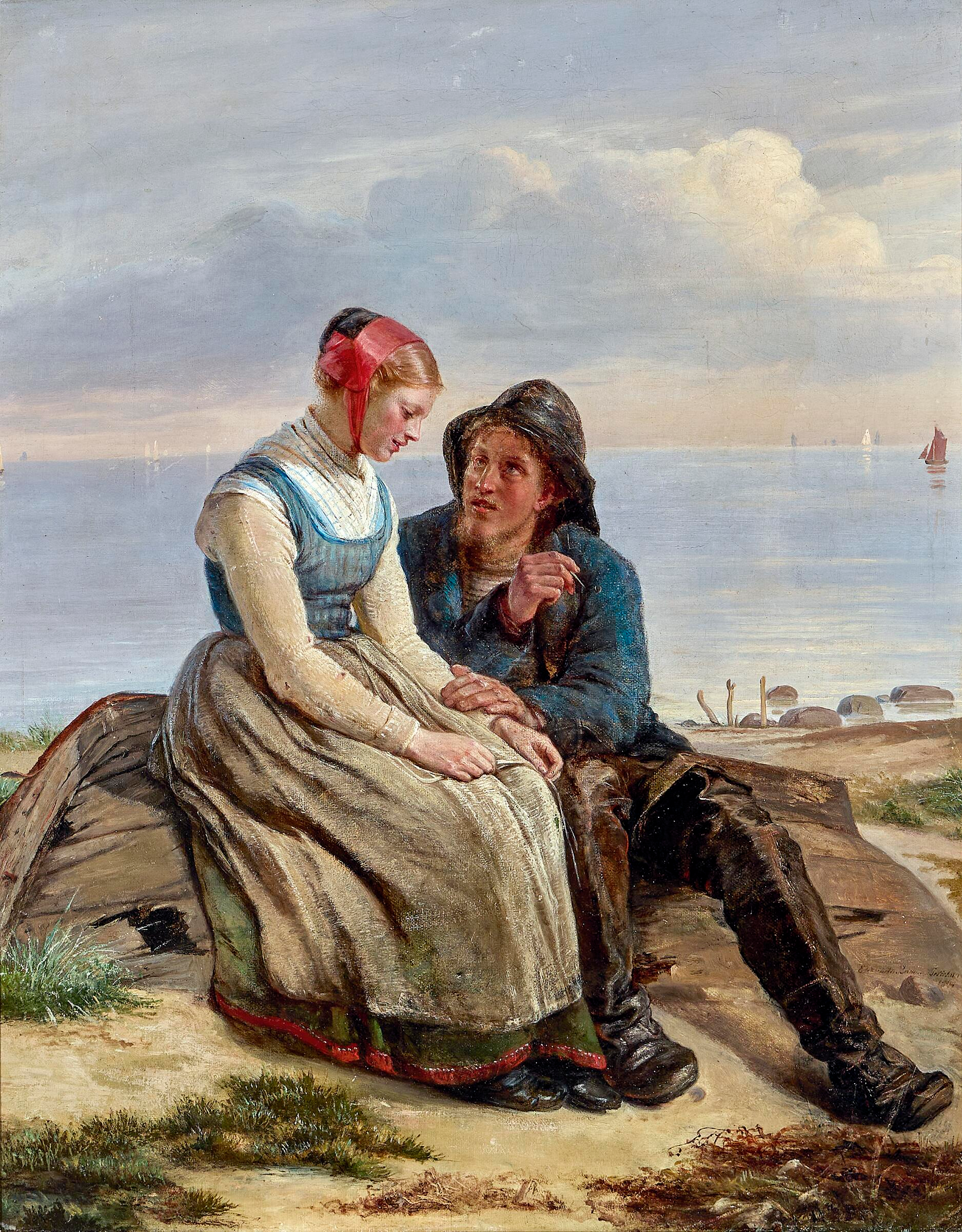
A Danish Fisherman's Courtship by Elisabeth Jerichau-Baumann

Robespierre Receiving Letters from Friends of his Victims with Assassination Threats by William Henry Fisk

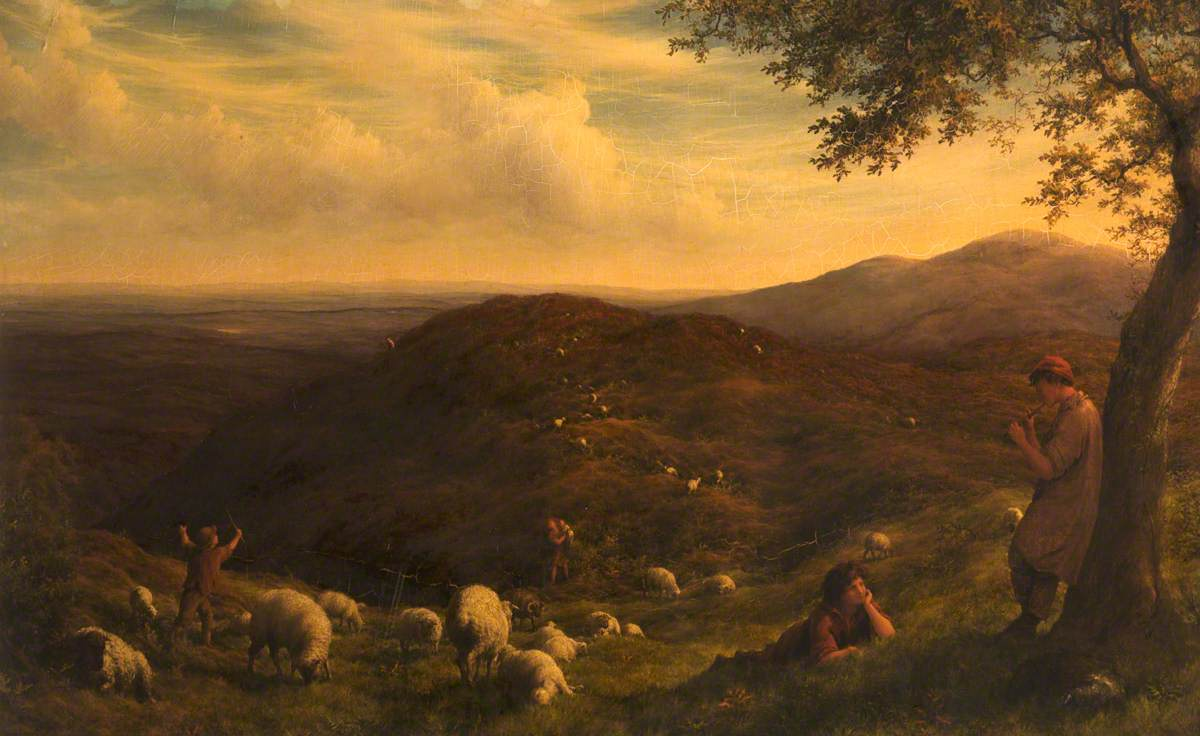
O'er the Muir Among the Heather by William Linnell

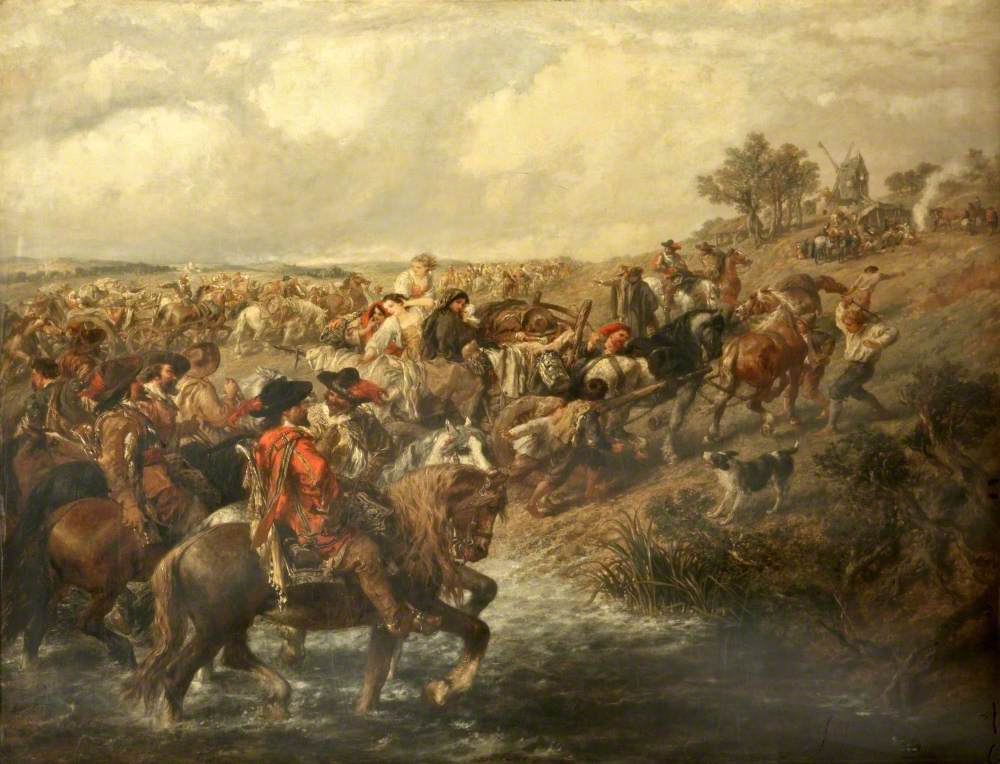
The Army on the March, The Rearguard with the Baggage Wagons by John Gilbert

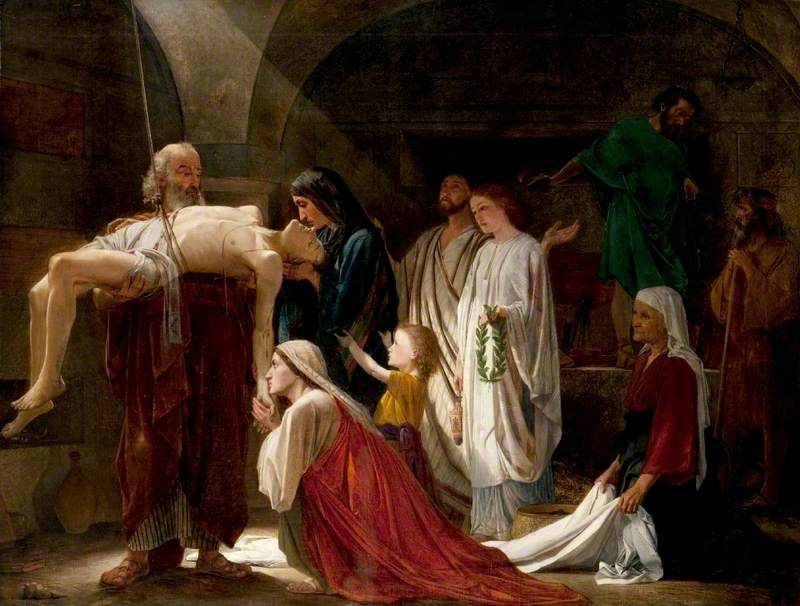
The Christian Martyr by Edward Armitage

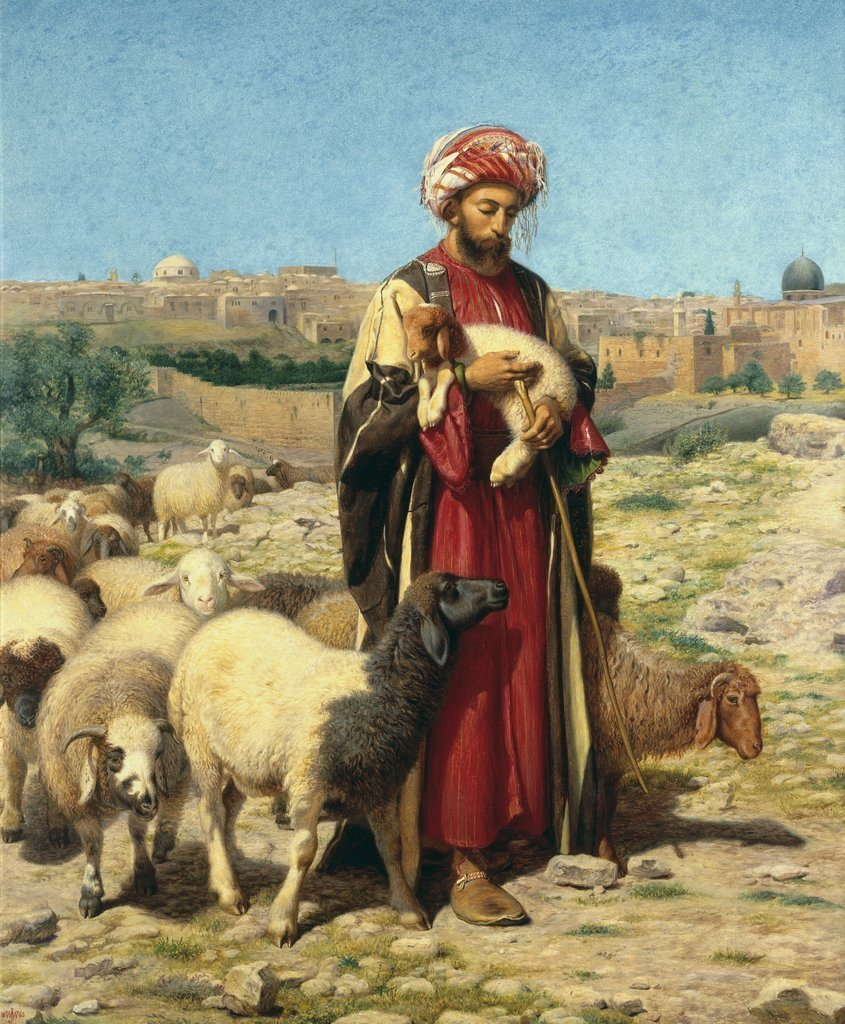
A Shepherd of Jerusalem by William James Webbe

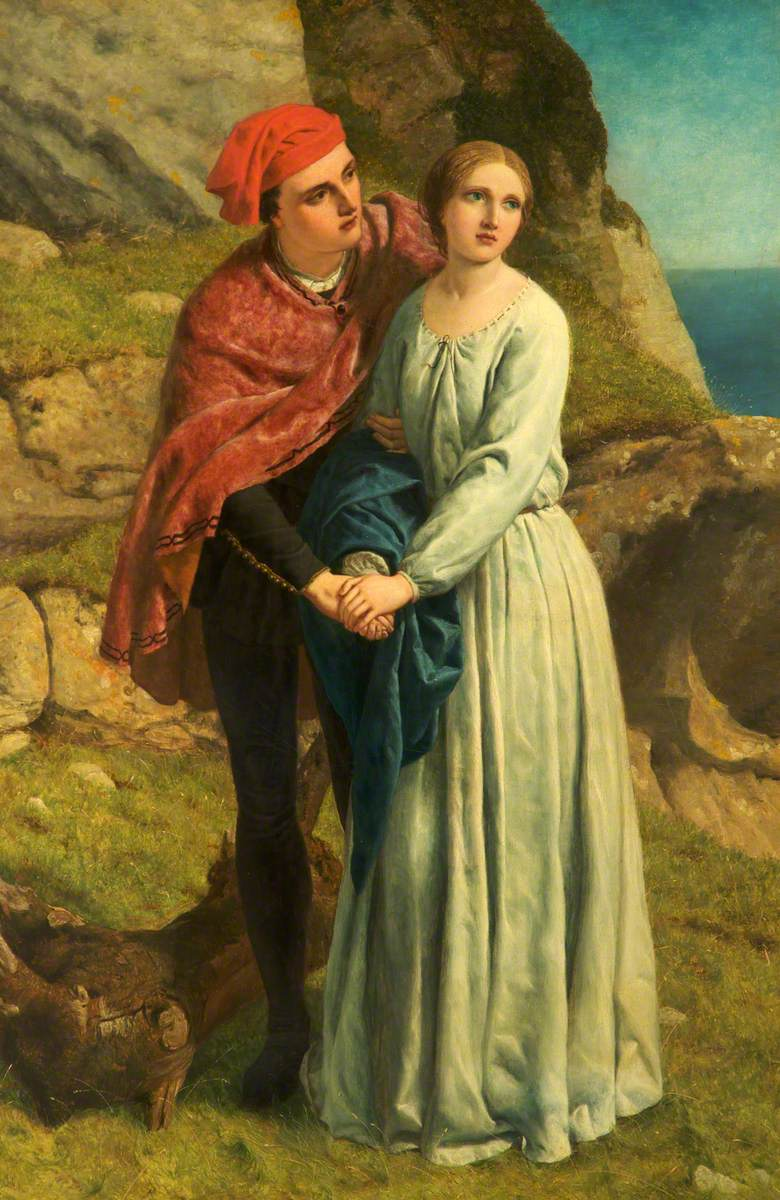
Ferdinand and Miranda by Frederick Richard Pickersgill

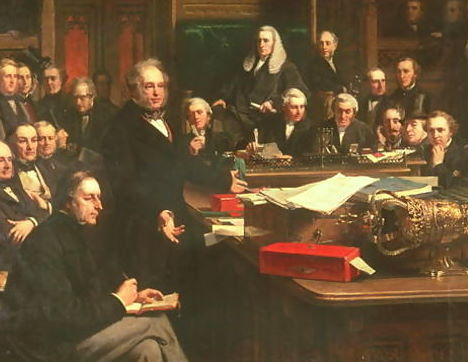
Lord Palmerston Adressing the House of Commons, 1860 by John Phillip

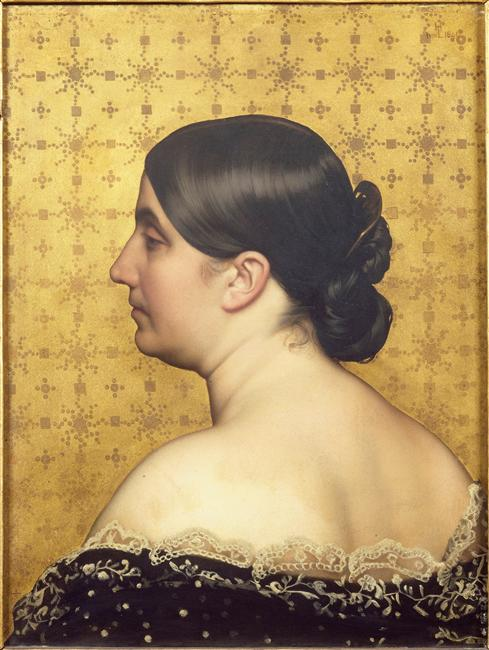
Madame Lehmann by Henri Lehmann

Portrait of Susanna Rose by Frederick Sandys

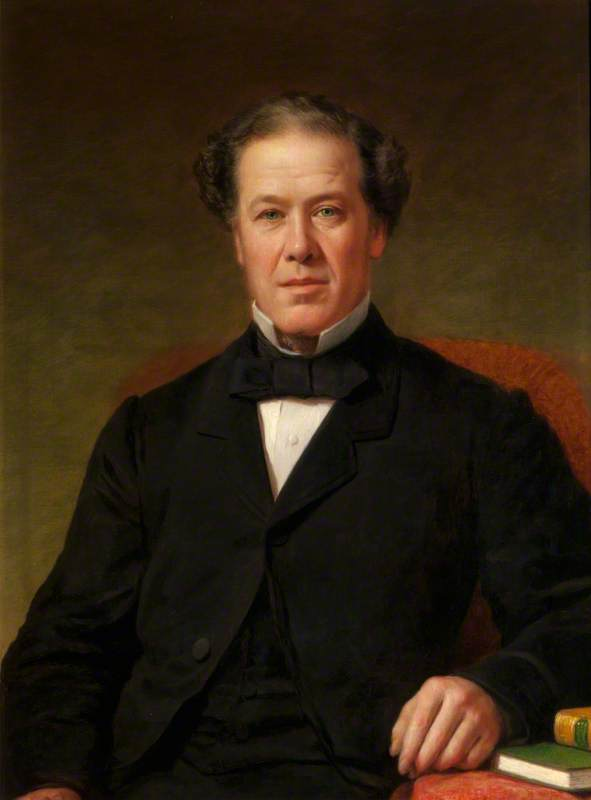
Andrew Lusk by Thomas Mackinlay

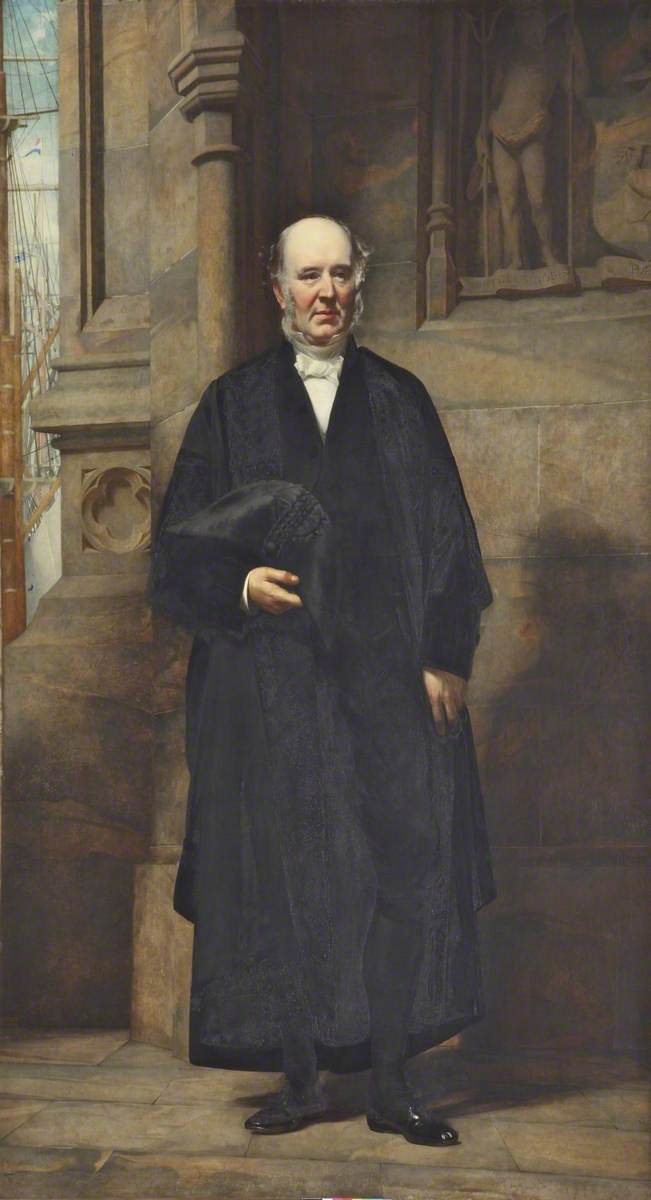
William Preston by John Ewart Robertson

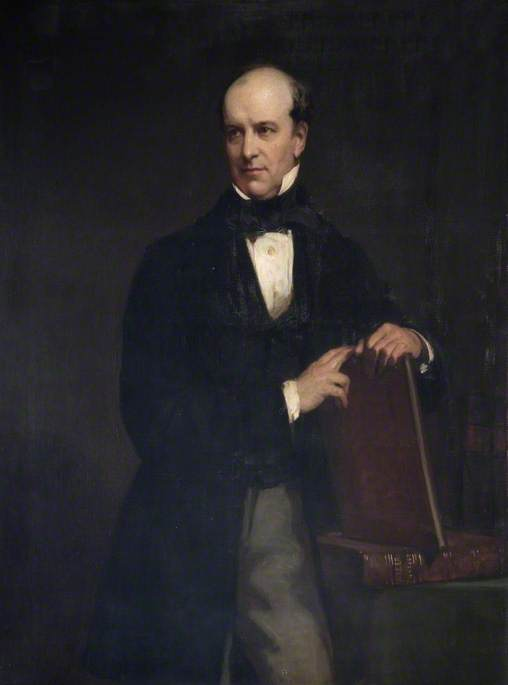
William Baly by John Prescott Knight

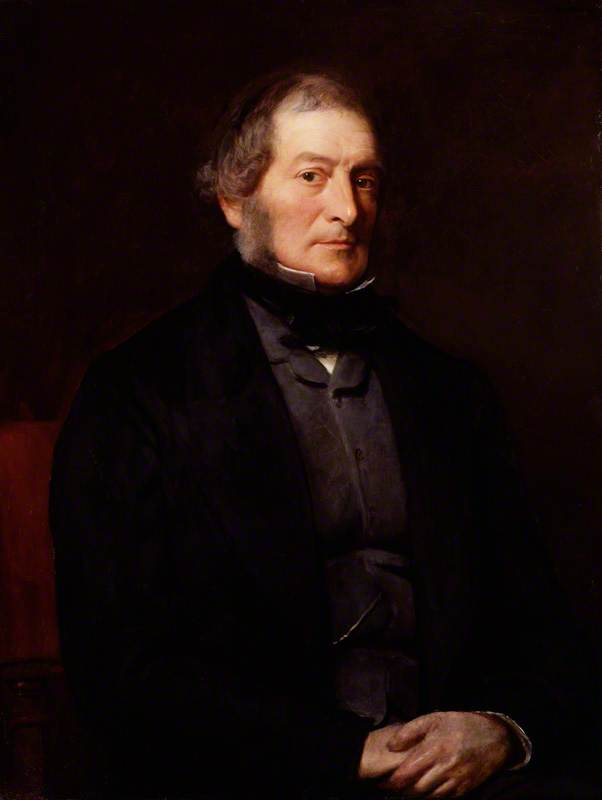
Lord Taunton by William Menzies Tweedie

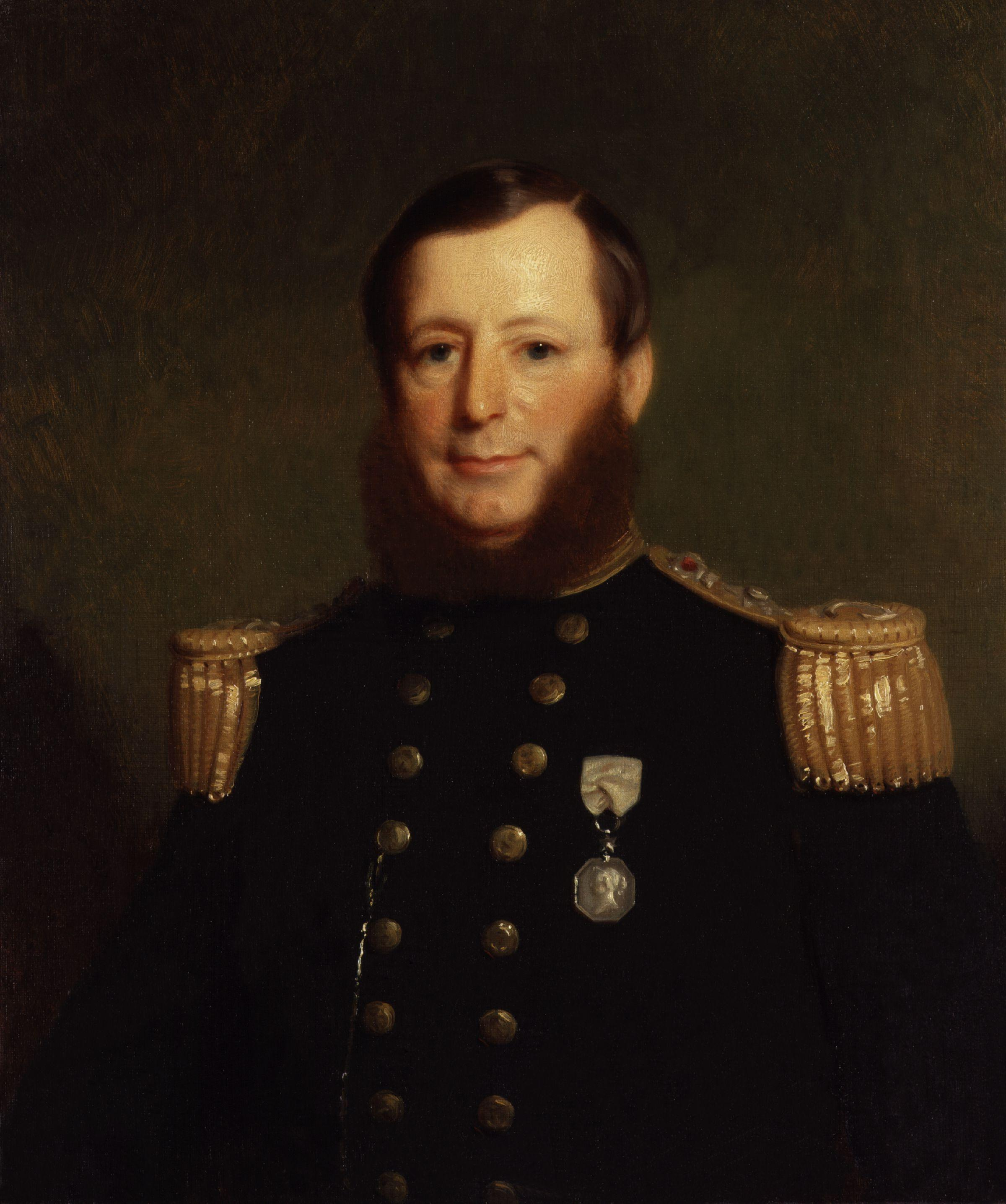
Thomas Edward Laws Moore by Stephen Pearce

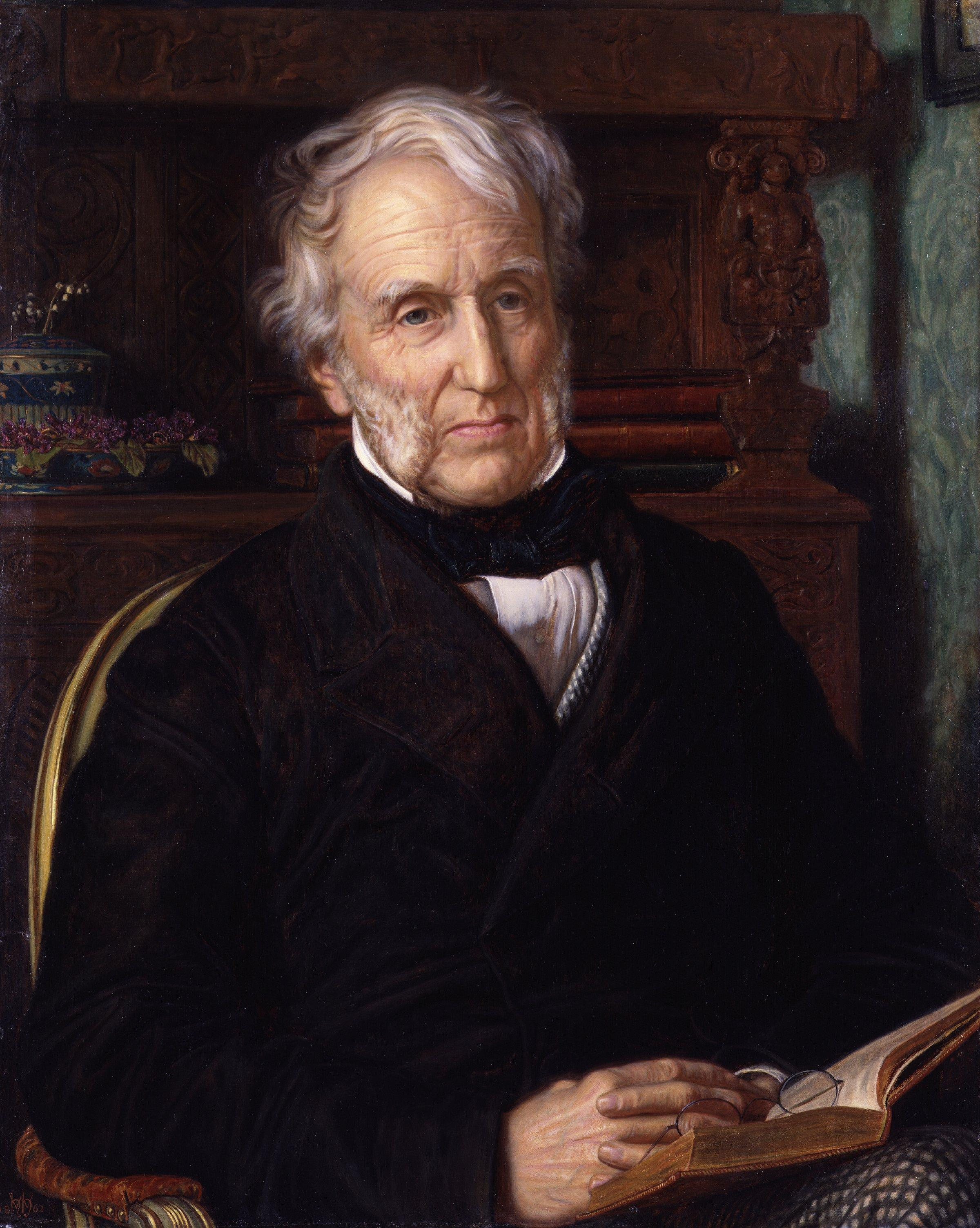
Stephen Lushington by William Holman Hunt

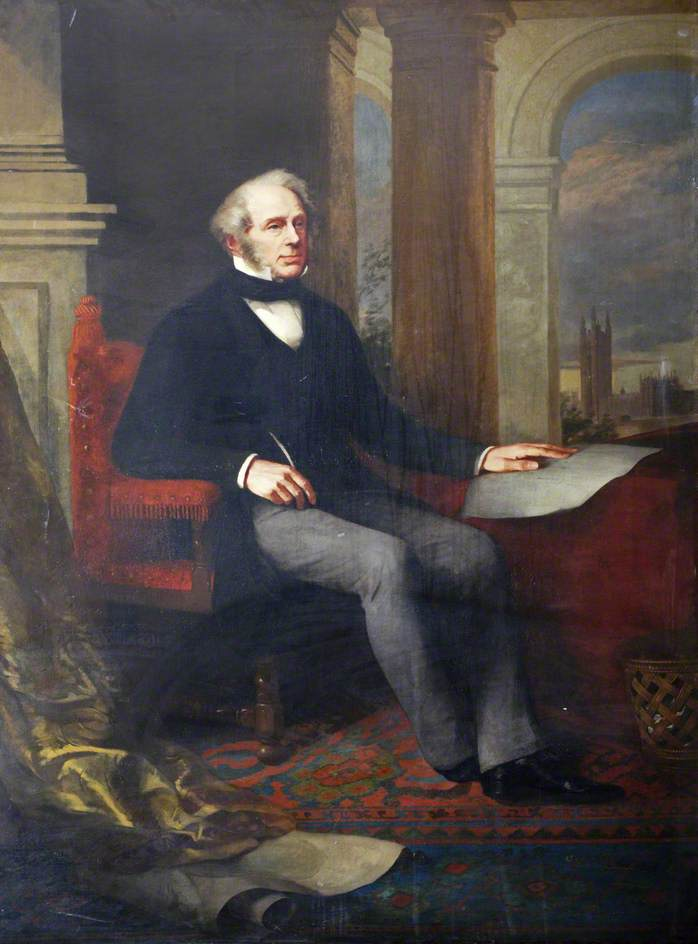
Lord Palmerston by William Thomas Roden

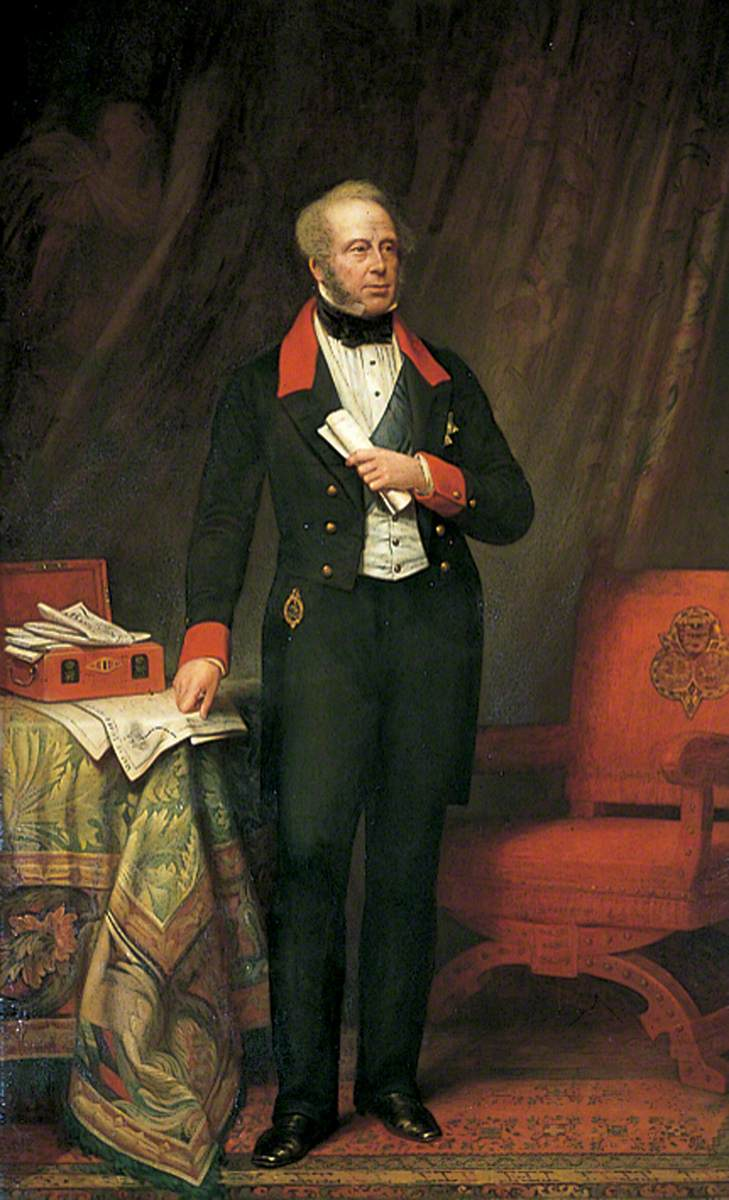
Lord Palmerston by Ebenezer Butler Morris

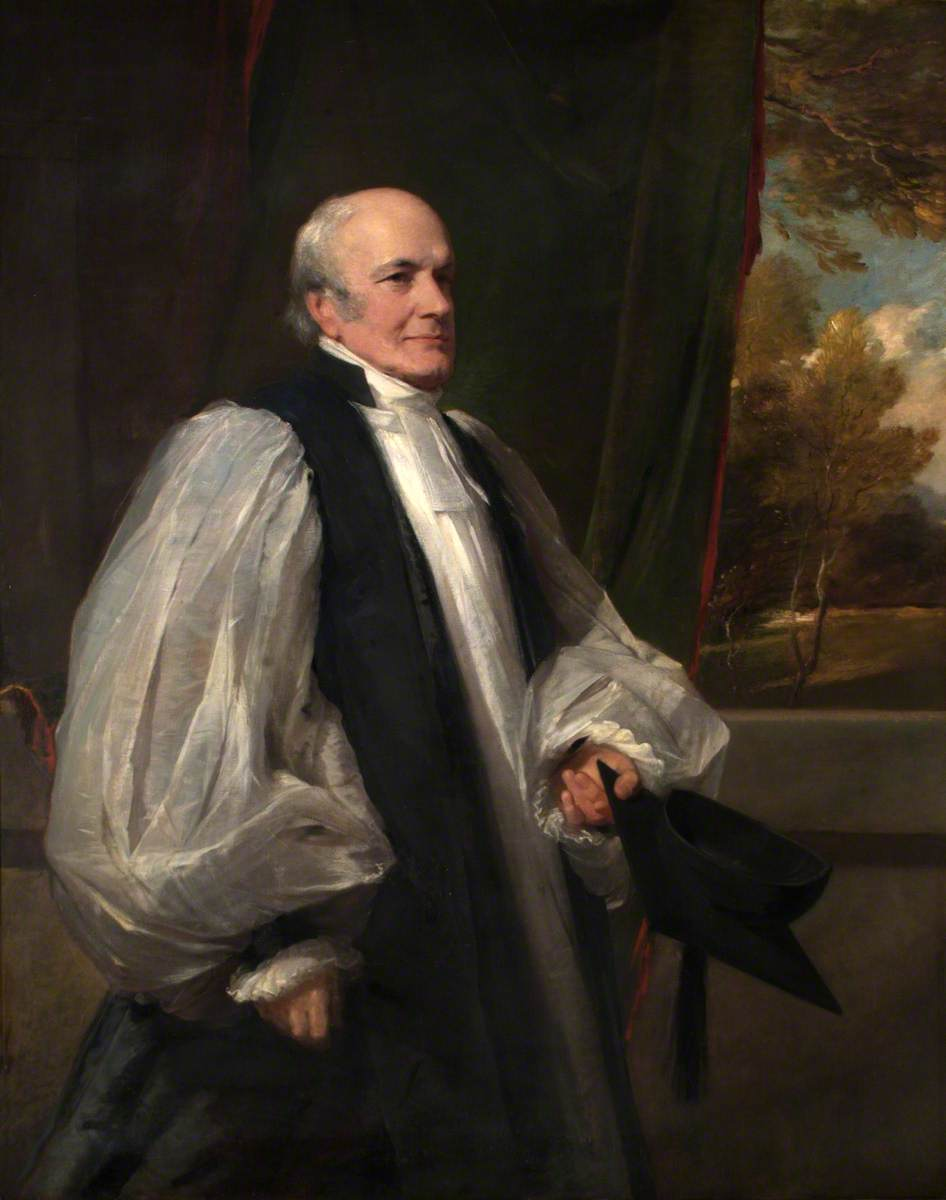
Charles Thomas Longley by George Richmond

== Bibliography ==
- Ormond, Richard. Sir Edwin Landseer. Philadelphia Museum of Art, 1981.
- Riding, Christine. John Everett Millais. Harry N. Abrams, 2006.
- Staley, Allen & Newall, Christopher. Pre-Raphaelite Vision: Truth to Nature. Harry N. Abrams, 2004.
- Sutherland, Daniel E. Whistler: A Life for Art's Sake. Yale University Press, 2014.
