= 1863 in art =

Events from the year 1863 in art.

== Events ==
- March – American-born painter James McNeill Whistler settles close to the River Thames in Chelsea, London, where he will live for most of the rest of his life.
- May 4 – The Royal Academy Exhibition of 1863 opens at the National Gallery in London
- June 12 – The Arts Club is founded by Charles Dickens, Anthony Trollope, Frederic Leighton and others in London's Mayfair as a social meeting place for those involved or interested in the creative arts.
- The École des Beaux-Arts in Paris becomes independent of the Académie des Beaux-Arts.
- Julia Margaret Cameron takes up photography.
- Alexander Gilchrist's Life of William Blake, "Pictor Ignotus" is published in London, edited posthumously by Anne Gilchrist.

== Exhibitions ==
- May 17 – Opening of first exhibition of the Salon des Refusés in Paris (in which Manet exhibits Le déjeuner sur l'herbe and two other paintings; Whistler exhibits Symphony in White, No. 1: The White Girl and Cézanne first exhibits), and coining of the term avant-garde.

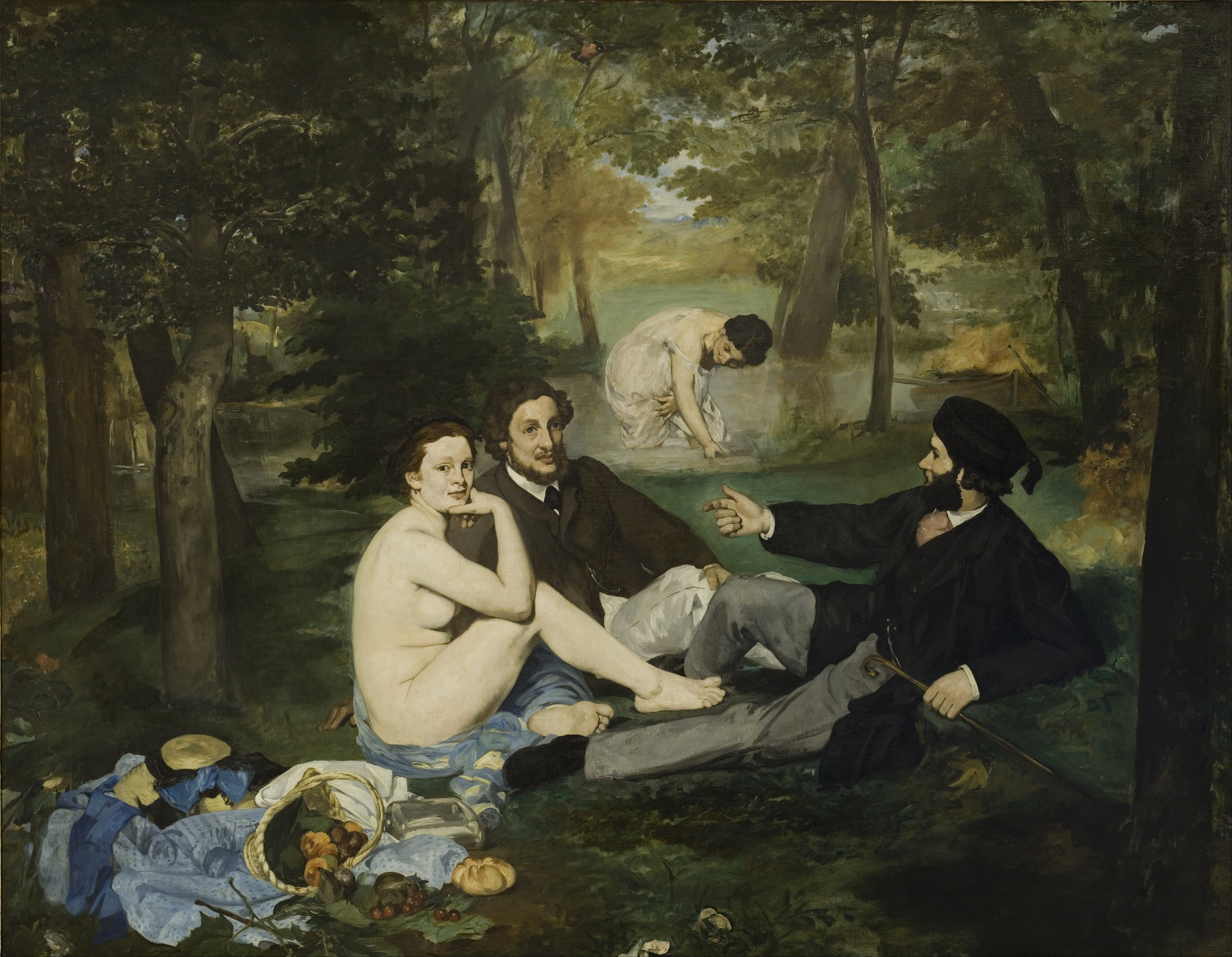
Manet – Le déjeuner sur l'herbe

== Works ==
- Peter Nicolai Arbo – Horse Herd on the High Mountains
- Thomas Jones Barker – 'The Secret of England's Greatness' (Queen Victoria presenting a Bible in the Audience Chamber at Windsor) (approximate date)
- Albert Bierstadt – The Rocky Mountains, Lander's Peak
- David Gilmour Blythe
  - Libby Prison
  - Man Eating in a Field
- Alexey Bogolyubov – Easter procession in Yaroslavl
- John Brett – Florence from Bellosguardo
- Alexandre Cabanel – The Birth of Venus (first version, Musée d'Orsay, Paris)
- Paul Cézanne – The Judgement of Paris (approximate date)
- Charles Camille Chazal – Institution of the Eucharist
- François-Claudius Compte-Calix – Vieil Ami
- Pierre Puvis de Chavannes – Work (Musée de Picardie, Amiens)
- Joseph Durham – Memorial to the Great Exhibition, London
- Thomas Charles Farrer – A Buckwheat Field on Thomas Cole's Farm
- Jean-Léon Gérôme – Dance of the Almeh
- John Callcott Horsley – The Morning of St Valentine
- Jozef Israëls – Fishermen's Children (first version)
- Italian – The Veiled Nun (marble bust, approximate date)
- Vilhelm Kyhn – Efter solnedgang i udkanten af en landsby ("After Sunset on the Outskirts of a Village")
- Édouard Manet
  - Le déjeuner sur l'herbe ("The Luncheon on the Grass" or "The Picnic") (Musée d'Orsay, Paris)
  - Olympia (Musée d'Orsay, Paris)
  - ‘’Young Woman Reclining in Spanish Costume’’
- Robert Braithwaite Martineau – The Last Chapter
- Jean-Louis-Ernest Meissonier – Napoleon III at the Battle of Solferino
- John Everett Millais
  - The Eve of St Agnes
  - My First Sermon
- Albert Joseph Moore – Wall decorations at Coombe Abbey
- Elisabet Ney – Eilhard Mitscherlich (sculpture)
- George Bernard O'Neill – Public Opinion
- Vincent Pilz – Pegasus (pair of bronzes) (approximate date)
- Dante Gabriel Rossetti – Joan of Arc Kissing the Sword of Deliverance
- Clarkson Stanfield – The Morning After Trafalgar
- Marcus Stone – On the Road from Waterloo to Paris
- James Tissot – The Two Sisters
- Eugene von Guerard – North-east View from the Northern Top of Mount Kosciusko
- Frederick Walker – The Lost Path
- Edward Matthew Ward – Hogarth's Studio in 1739
- James McNeill Whistler
  - Battersea Reach
  - Grey and Silver: Old Battersea Reach

== Births ==
- January 11 – Mary Tannahill, American painter and artist in fabrics (died 1951)
- January 29 – Suzette Holten, née Skovgaard, Danish painter and ceramist (died 1937)
- April 3 – Henry van de Velde, Belgian painter, architect and designer, co-founder of the Art Nouveau movement (died 1957)
- May 17 – C. R. Ashbee, English designer (died 1942)
- June 12 – Bertram Mackennal, Australian sculptor (died 1931)
- June 16 – Arturo Michelena, Venezuelan painter (died 1898)
- June 21 – Anne Marie Carl-Nielsen, née Brodersen, Danish sculptor (died 1945)
- June 27 – Henri Beau, Canadian Impressionist painter (died 1949)
- August 30 (August 18 Old Style) – Sergey Prokudin-Gorsky, Russian color photographer (died 1944)
- September 6 – Jessie Willcox Smith, American illustrator (died 1935)
- October 24 – Bertha Jaques, American etcher (died 1941)
- November 11 – Paul Signac, French neo-Impressionist painter (died 1935)
- December 5 – George Pirie, Scottish painter (died 1946)
- December 12 – Edvard Munch, Norwegian painter (died 1944)

== Deaths ==
- January 6 – Harriet Gouldsmith, English landscape painter and etcher (born 1787)
- January 17 – Horace Vernet, French painter of battles, portraits, and Orientalist Arab subjects (born 1789)
- February 6 – Karl Ludwig Frommel, German landscape painter and engraver (born 1789)
- February 16 – Alvan Fisher, American pioneer in landscape painting and genre works (born 1792)
- February 20 – John Cart Burgess, English watercolour painter of flowers and landscapes (born 1798)
- April 4 – Ludwig Emil Grimm, German painter and engraver (born 1790)
- June 5 – Marie Ellenrieder, German painter (born 1791)
- July 7 – William Mulready, Irish genre painter of rural scenes (born 1786)
- July 12 – Étienne-Jean Delécluze, French painter and critic (born 1781)
- August 13 – Eugène Delacroix, French Romantic painter (born 1798)
- September 19 – Joseph Nigg – Austrian painter, with painting on porcelain a specialty (born 1782)
- December 4 – James Duffield Harding, English landscape painter (born 1798)
- December 10 – Charles C. Ingham, Irish portrait painter and founder of the New York National Academy of Design (born 1797)
- December 27 – Maria Martin, American watercolor painter (born 1796)
- date unknown
  - Tommaso Benedetti, Austrian painter (born 1797)
  - Per Krafft the Younger, Swedish portrait and historical painter (born 1777)
  - Nukina Kaioku, Japanese painter and calligrapher (born 1778)
  - Johannes Baptista van Acker, Flemish portrait miniature painter (born 1794)
