= Memorial to the Great Exhibition =

1863 monument by Joseph Durham

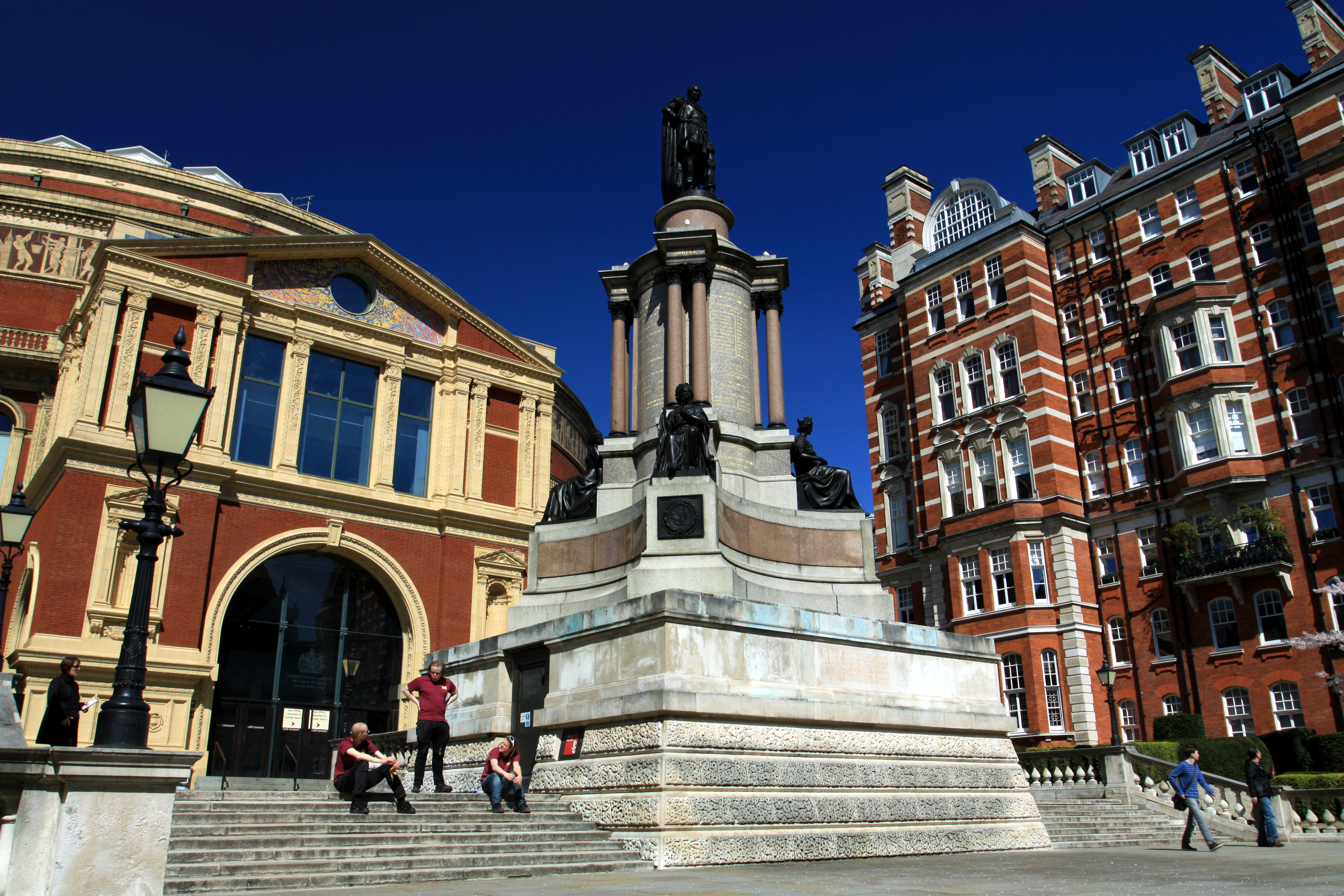
- The memorial in 2013
- Location: London, United Kingdom; 51.500342°N 0.177292°W

The Memorial to the Great Exhibition is an outdoor monument commemorating the Great Exhibition (1851) and depicting Albert, Prince Consort, designed by Joseph Durham with modifications by Sydney Smirke and located south of Royal Albert Hall in London, United Kingdom. Originally installed in the Royal Horticultural Society gardens in 1863, it was relocated to its current site during 1891–1893 when the gardens were reconstructed and Prince Consort Road was created.

== See also ==
- 1863 in art
- Albert Memorial
