= Frank Stone (painter) =

English painter

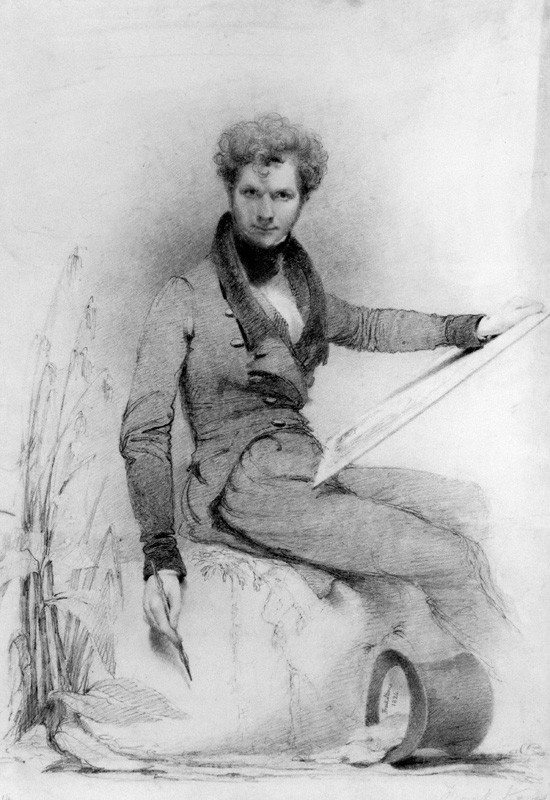
Self-portrait in pencil (1824)

Frank Stone ARA (22 August 1800 – 18 November 1859) was an English painter. He was born in Manchester, and was entirely self-taught.

== Career ==
He was elected an Associate of the Society of Painters in Water Colours in 1833 and Member in 1843; and an Associate of the Royal Academy in 1851.

The works he first exhibited at the Academy were portraits, but from 1840 onwards he contributed figure pictures, scenes from Shakespeare, scripture and sentimental subjects, many of which were engraved.

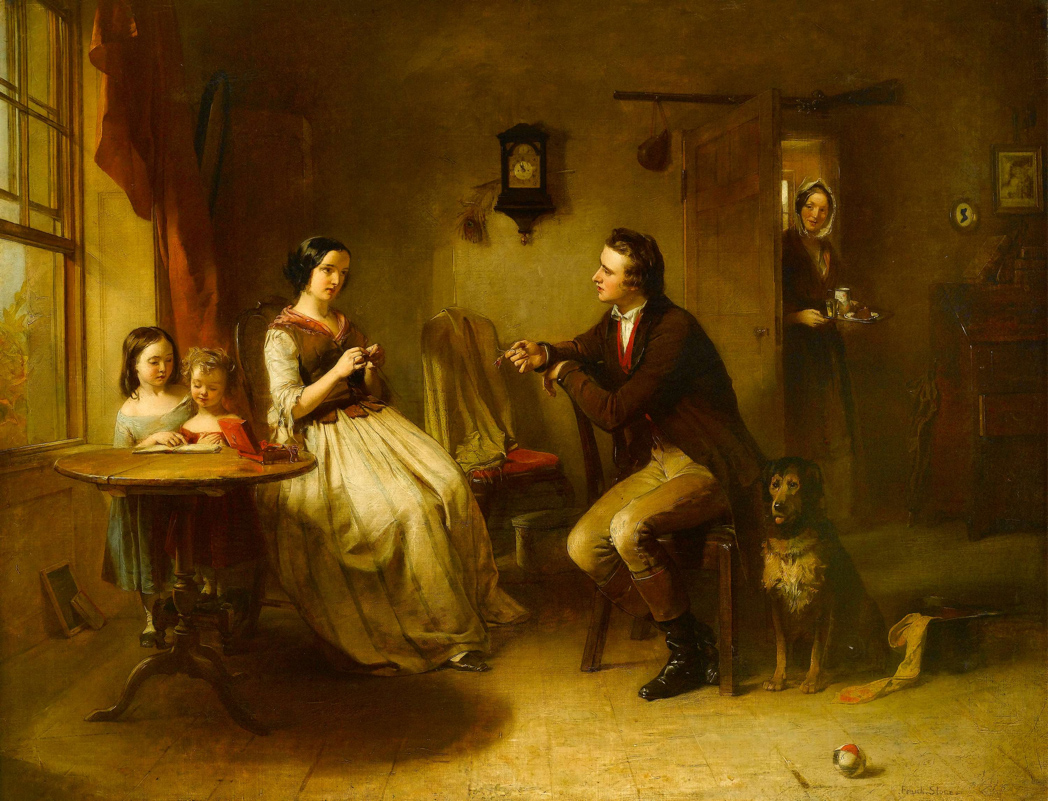
The Proposal

In 1850 he led the opposition within the Academy to the innovations of the Pre-Raphaelite Brotherhood, having already criticised their work in the previous year. When Dante Gabriel Rossetti wrote a very critical review of Stone's work in return, Stone launched an outright assault on Pre-Raphaelitism, initiating the controversy that engulfed the movement. Leading Pre-Raphaelite William Holman Hunt later depicted a print of one of Stone's works in the background of his painting The Awakening Conscience. It has been suggested that this was intended as an insult, since the furniture of the room was supposed to represent the bad taste of the characters depicted.

Among London writers and artists Stone had many acquaintances. He was the associate of Thackeray, and of the poets Campbell and Rogers, and the intimate friend of Dickens. From 1845 to 1851 he resided at Tavistock House, Tavistock Square (afterwards the dwelling of Dickens). He frequently assisted Dickens in theatricals, and in 1847 he accompanied the novelist in a troupe of amateur players on a tour in the north.

According to William Powell Frith, Stone was a loyal friend, but very argumentative, "No fair-weather friend was he, but true as steel when friendly countenance might be sorely needed. Still, I confess there were drawbacks to the enjoyment of Stone's society. It was enough for anyone to advance an opinion for Stone to differ from it."

He was the father of the painter Marcus Stone who illustrated many works by Charles Dickens (the Stones were Dickens' neighbours for many years) and himself produced a frontispiece for an edition of Martin Chuzzlewit. He also had a daughter, Ellen Stone.

Stone died on 18 November 1859, and was buried six days later on the western side of Highgate Cemetery. The inscription on his grave (plot no.9947) has largely worn away.

== Gallery ==
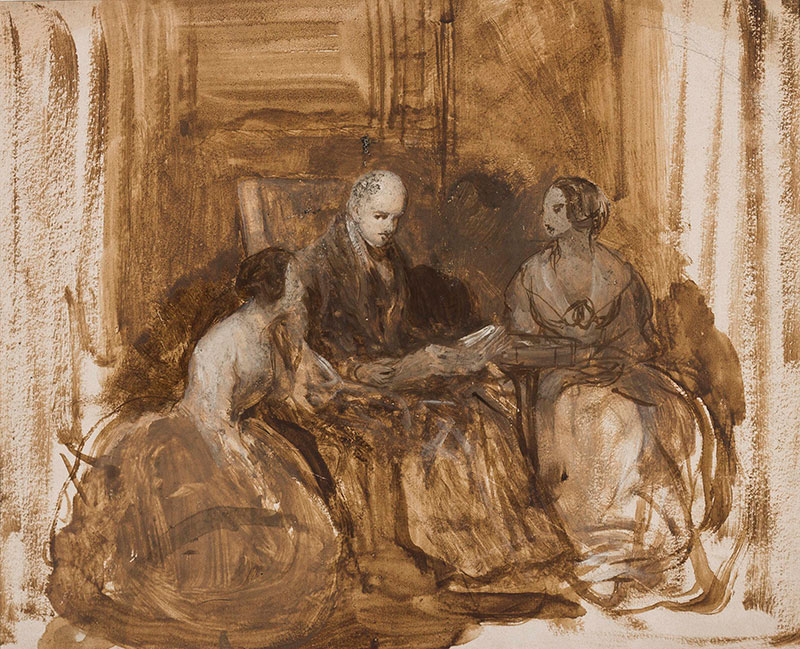
"Samuel Rogers (1763-1855) with Caroline Norton (1808-1877) and Maria-Louisa Phipps (d.1888), oil sketch

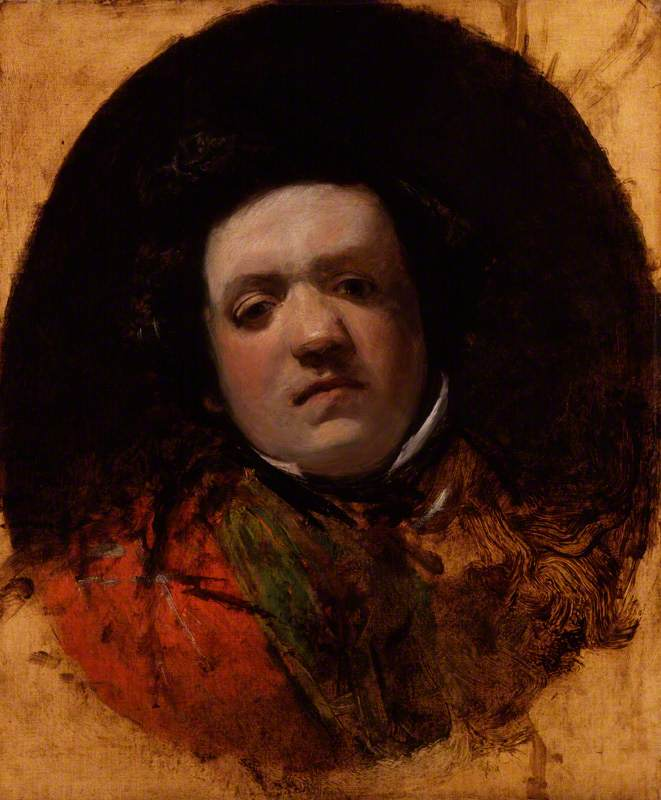
William Makepeace Thackeray

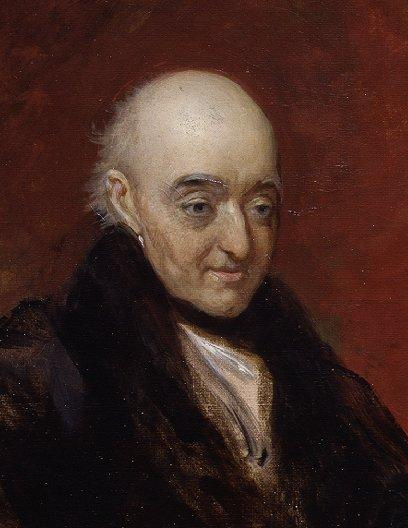
Samuel Rogers

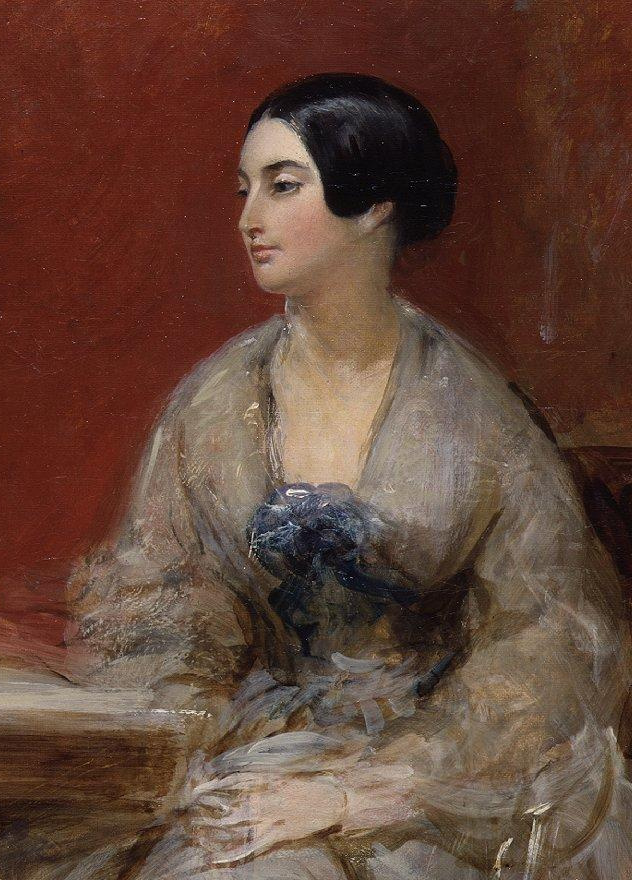
Caroline Norton

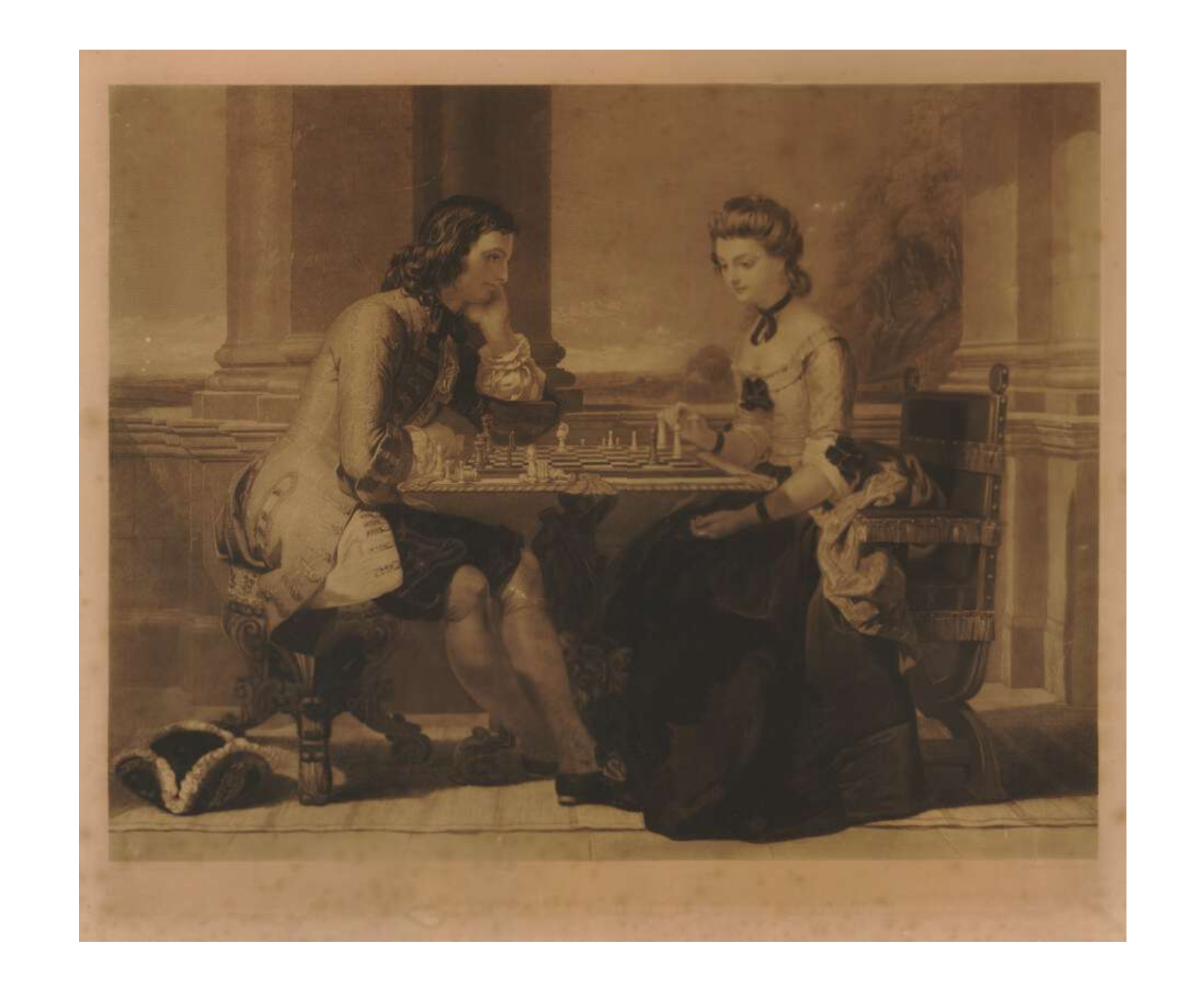
Couple Playing Chess (engraving)

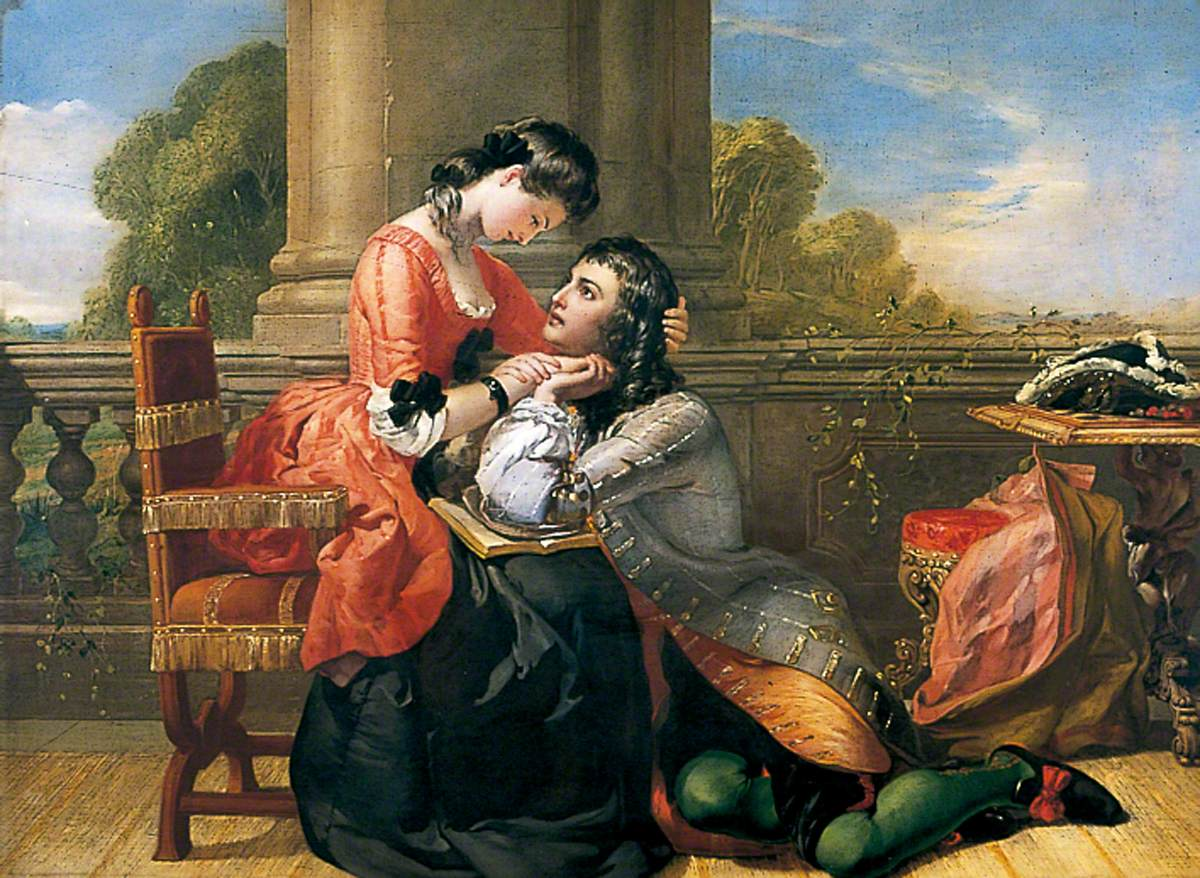
"Mated"

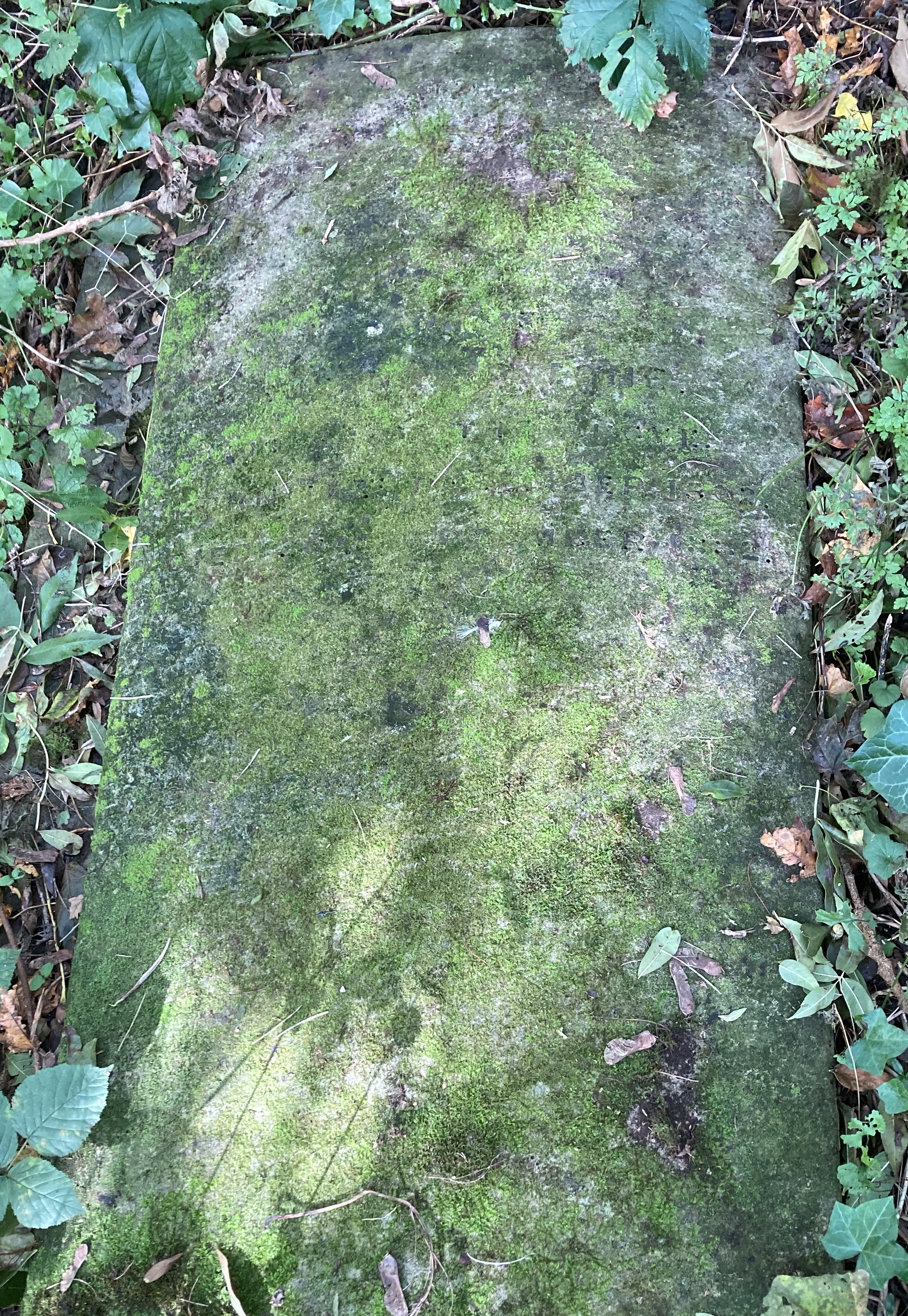
Gravestone in Highgate Cemetery
