= The Last Day of the Sale =

Painting by George Bernard O'Neill

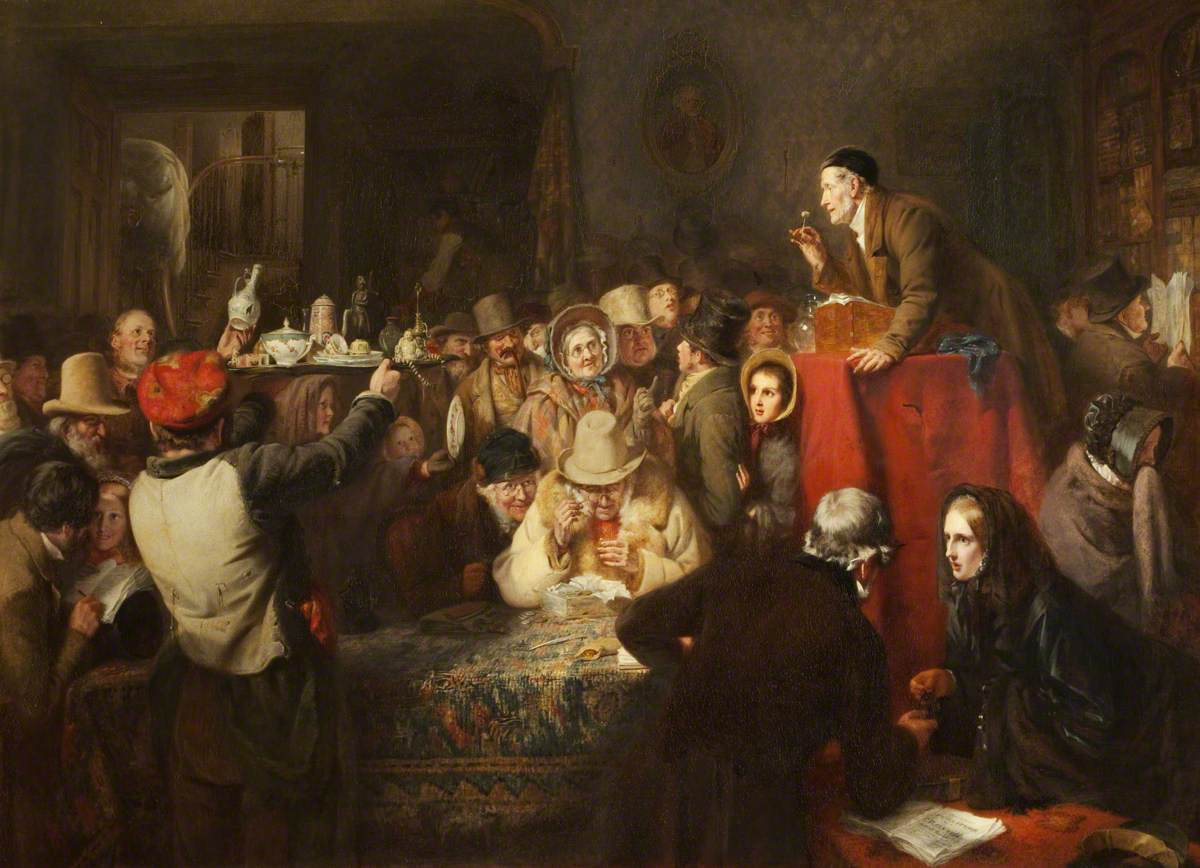
- Artist: George Bernard O'Neill
- Year: 1857
- Type: Oil on canvas, genre painting
- Dimensions: 73.7 cm × 113 cm (29.0 in × 44 in)
- Location: Towneley Art Gallery, Burnley

The Last Day of the Sale is an 1857 genre painting by the Irish artist George Bernard O'Neill. It depicts an auction taking place as the property of a mid-Victorian era English house are sold off. That this is an enforced sale is made clear by the black-clad young widow in the bottom right and her weeping mother-in-law. They this is the last day is made clear by the hucksters who have gathered to pick up bargains.

The painting was displayed at the Royal Academy Exhibition of 1857 held at the National Gallery in London. It featured again at the 1862 International Exhibition in South Kensington. Today the painting is part of the collection of the Towneley Art Gallery in Burnley, having been acquired in 1921.

== Bibliography ==
- Anderson, Gail-Nina & Wright, Joanne. The Pursuit of Leisure: Victorian Depictions of Pastimes. Djanogly Art Gallery, 1997.
- Gaunt, William. The Restless Century: Painting in Britain, 1800–1900. Phaidon, 1972.
- Pennell, Sara & Stobart, Jon. Auctions and the Consumption of Second-Hand Goods in Georgian England. Bloomsbury Publishing, 2025.
