= François-Claudius Compte-Calix =

French painter (1813–1880)

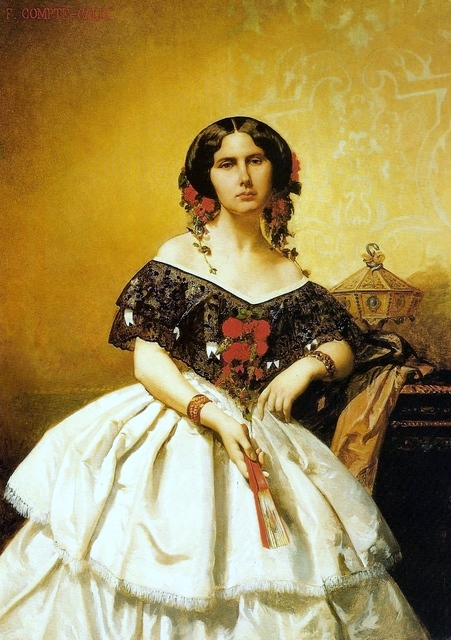
Portrait of the Marchioness of Itamaraty; now in the Museu Histório e Diplomático in Rio de Janeiro

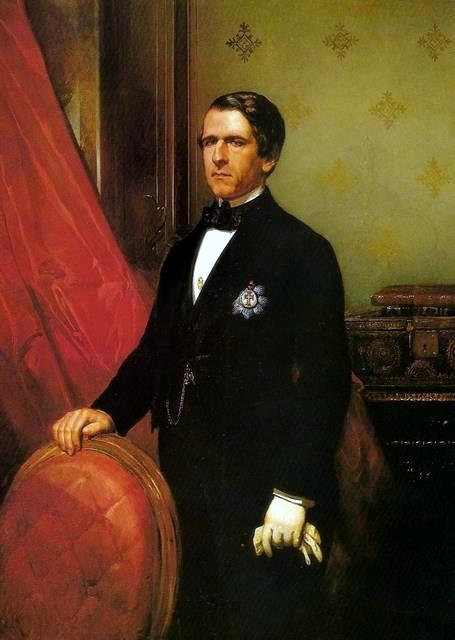
Portrait of the Count of Itamaraty

François-Claudius Compte-Calix (1813–1880) was a French painter known for genre subjects and portraits. He was born in Lyons and studied in the fine art school of his native city, and in the studio of J. C. Bonnefond. He first exhibited at the Paris Salon in 1840. His Vieil Ami, painted in 1863, was in the International Exhibition at Paris in 1867. He died at Chazay d'Azergues near Lyons in 1880.
