= Public Opinion (painting) =

Painting by George Bernard O'Neill

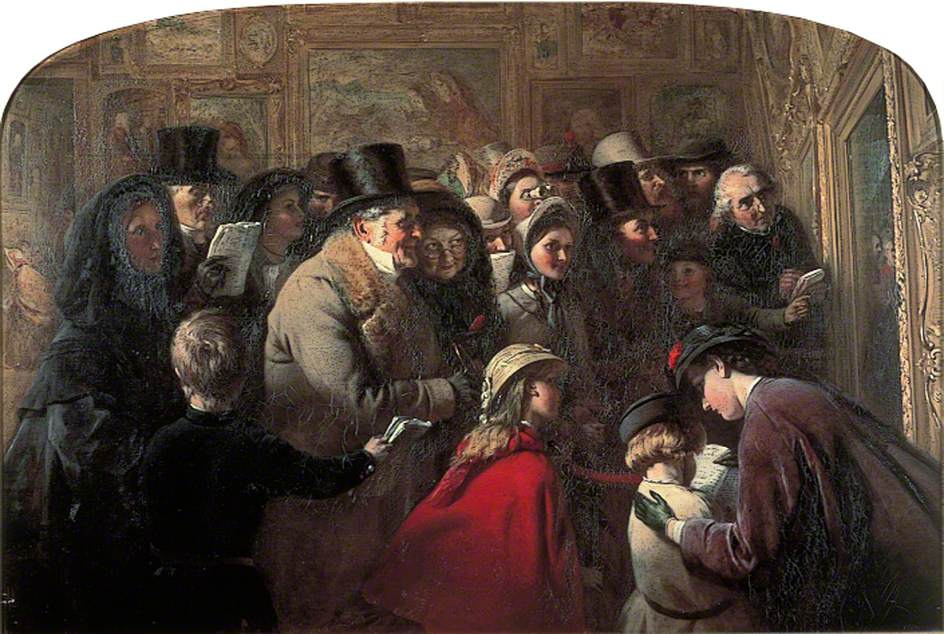
- Artist: George Bernard O'Neill
- Year: 1863
- Type: Oil on canvas, genre painting
- Dimensions: 53.2 cm × 78.8 cm (20.9 in × 31.0 in)
- Location: Leeds Art Gallery, West Yorkshire

Public Opinion is an 1863 oil painting by the Irish artist George Bernard O'Neill. It depicts a scene from the annual Royal Academy Exhibition. A large crowd of spectators gathered round a largely unseen painting, which has been railed off to stop the public getting too close. This echoes the intense popularity of some works. Notably in 1858 William Powell Frith's The Derby Day had to be protected to prevent the crowds from overwhelming it.

O'Neill was associated with the Cranbrook Group of artists who focused on depicting everyday scenes of British life during the Victorian eraThe painting was displayed at the Royal Academy Exhibition of 1863 at the National Gallery in London Today it is part of the collection of Leeds Art Gallery which acquired it in 1888.

== Bibliography ==
- Alyal, Amina & Anderson, Susan (ed.) Victorian Cultures of Liminality: Borders and Margins. Cambridge Scholars Publishing, 2018.
- Fletcher, Pamela. The Victorian Painting of Modern Life. Taylor & Francis, 2024.
- Lambourne, Lionel. Victorian Painting. Phaidon, 1999.
- Thomas, Julia. Pictorial Victorians: The Inscription of Values in Word and Image. Ohio University Press, 2004.
- Teukolsky, Rachel. The Literate Eye: Victorian Art Writing and Modernist Aesthetics. Oxford University Press, 2009
