= Marcus Stone =

British artist (1840–1921)

Marcus Stone RA
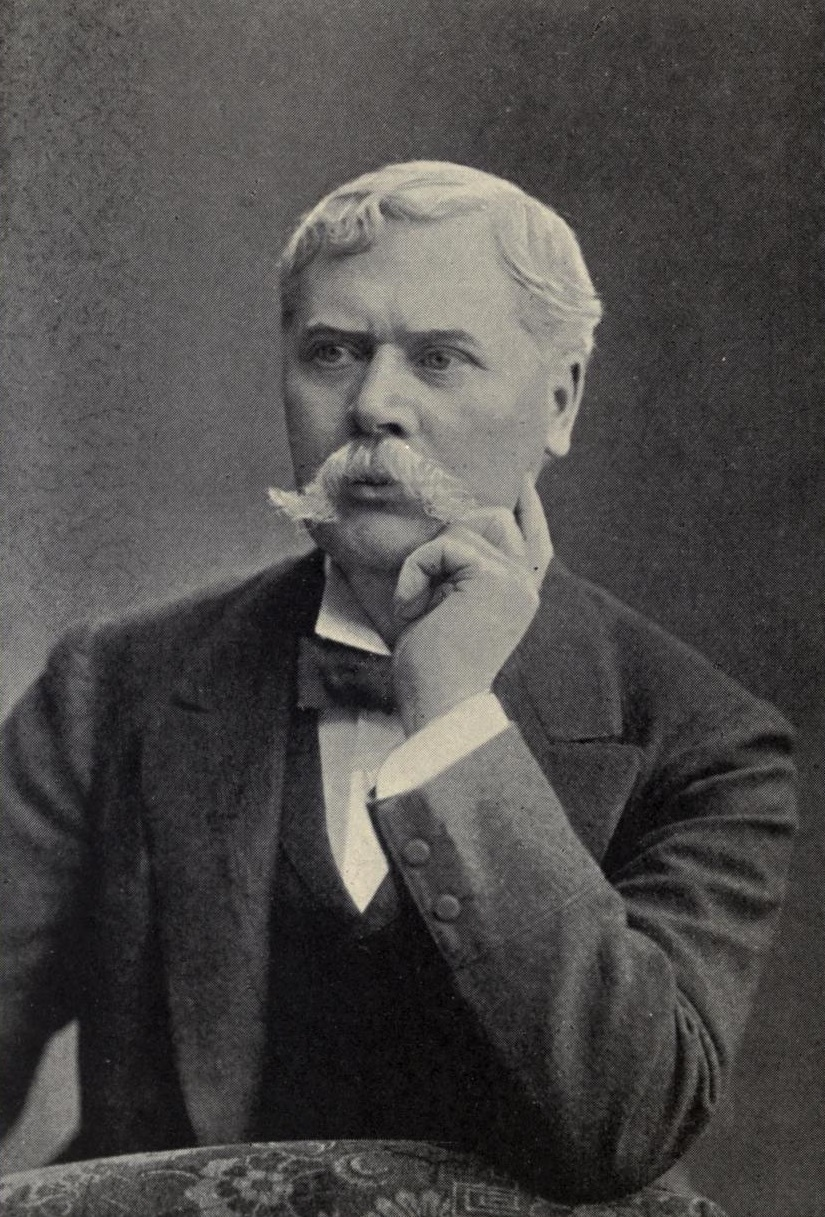
- Born: 4 July 1840; London, United Kingdom
- Died: 24 March 1921 (aged 80); Kensington, London
- Education: Royal Academy
- Notable work: In Love (1888)
- Parent: Frank Stone

Marcus Clayton Stone RA (4 July 1840 – 24 March 1921) was an English painter and illustrator.

== Life ==
Marcus Clayton Stone was the son of Frank Stone ARA. Born in London, Marcus was trained by his father and began to exhibit at the Royal Academy, before he was eighteen. He was educated at the Royal Academy.

In the 1860s Stone illustrated books by Charles Dickens (including the first editions of Great Expectations and Our Mutual Friend), Anthony Trollope, and other writers who were friends of his family.

Stone was elected an Associate of the Royal Academy in 1877, and Academician in 1887. In his earlier pictures, he dealt much with historical incidents, but in his later work, he occupied himself chiefly with a particular type of dainty sentiment, treated with much charm, refinement and executive skill.

One of his canvases is in Tate. Most of his works have been engraved, and medals were awarded to him at exhibitions in all parts of the world.

Stone and fellow painter Luke Fildes both lived in Melbury Road, Holland Park, in houses designed by Richard Norman Shaw. A blue plaque commemorates Stone at his house at 8 Melbury Road. In 1871, at Marylebone, Stone married Laura Mary H Broun, the daughter of the New Zealand merchant William Brown.

== Gallery ==
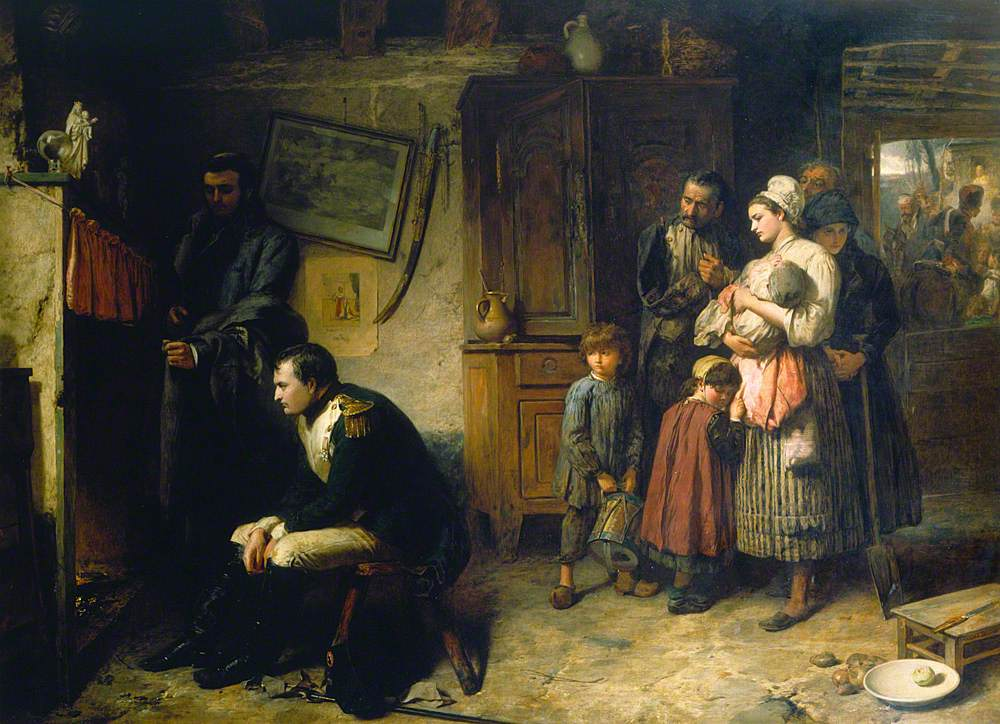
On the Road from Waterloo to Paris, 1863

Stealing the Keys, 1866

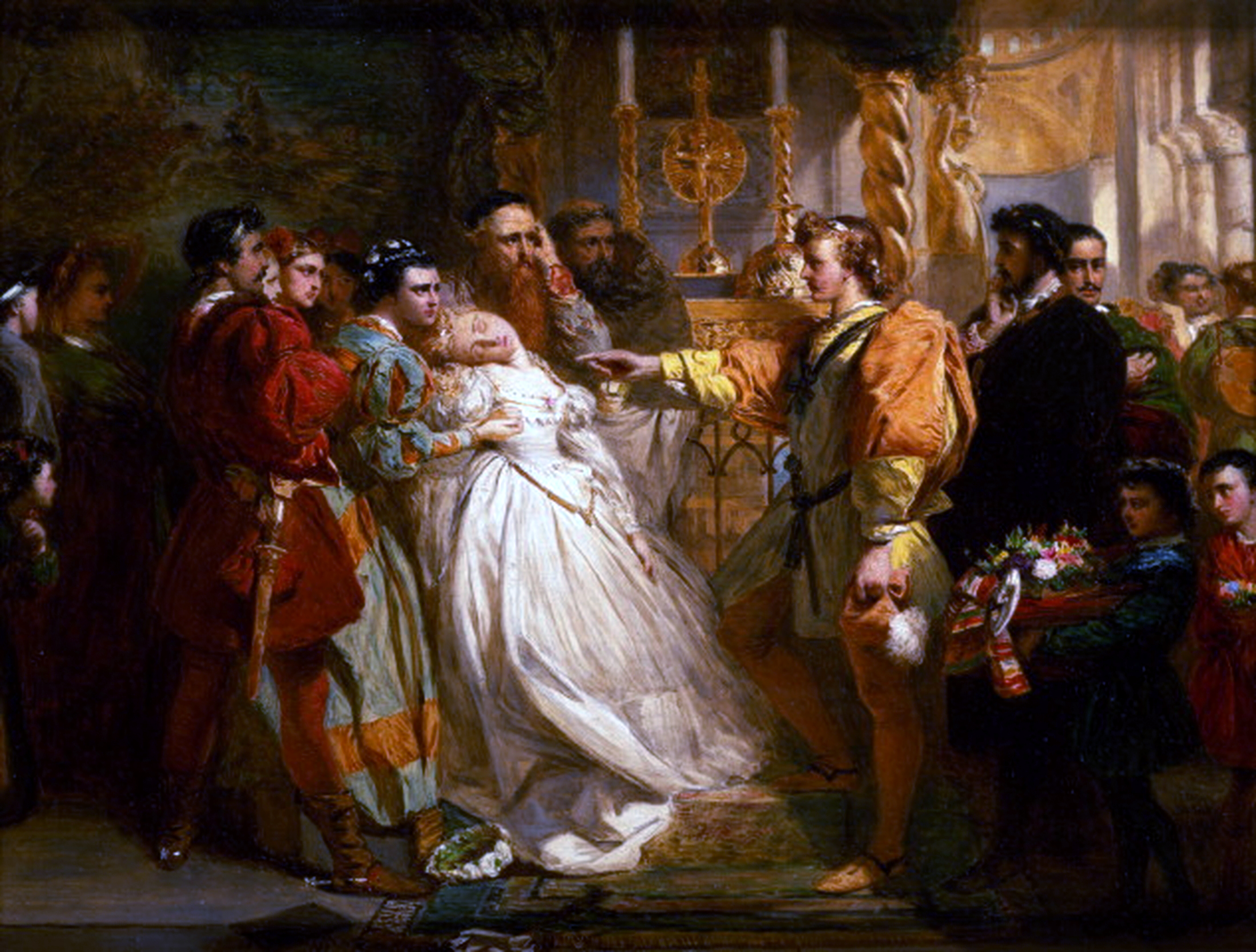
"Claudio, deceived by Don John, accuses Hero"—scene from Much Ado About Nothing, painted by Marcus Stone

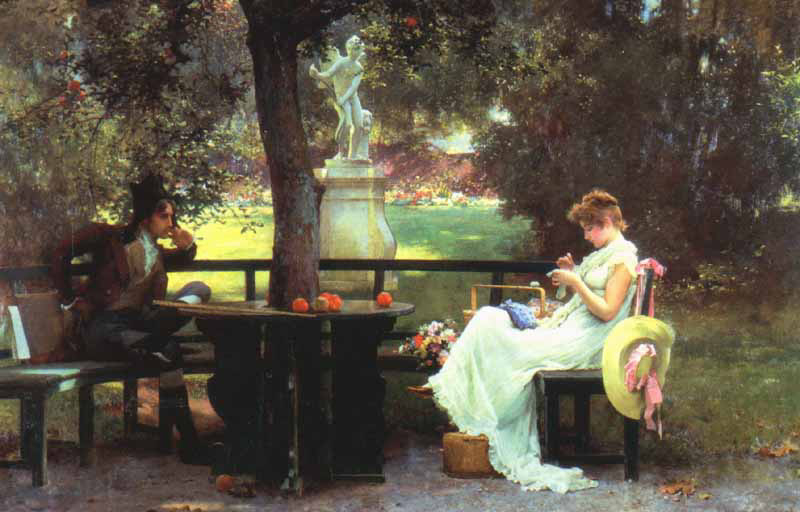
In Love, 1888

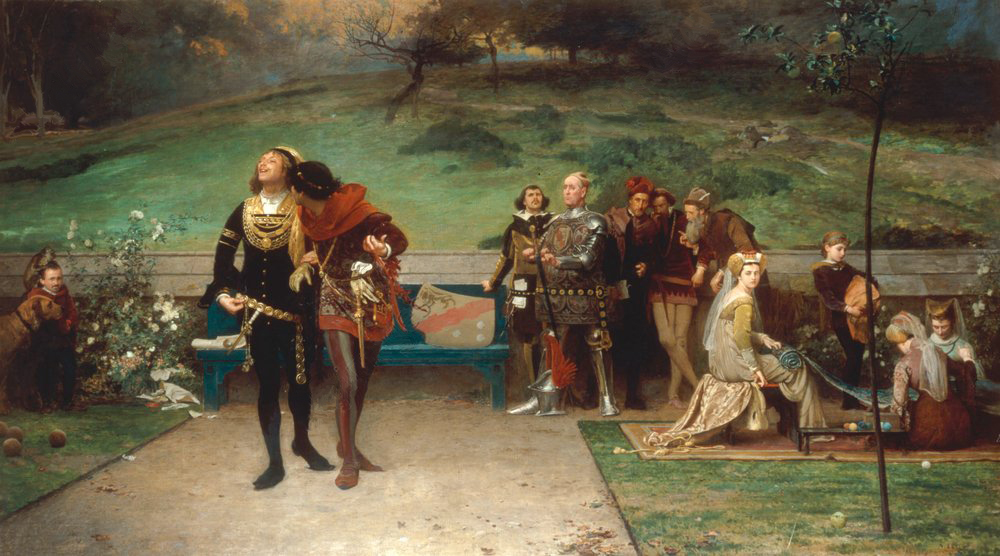
Edward II and Gaveston (1872)

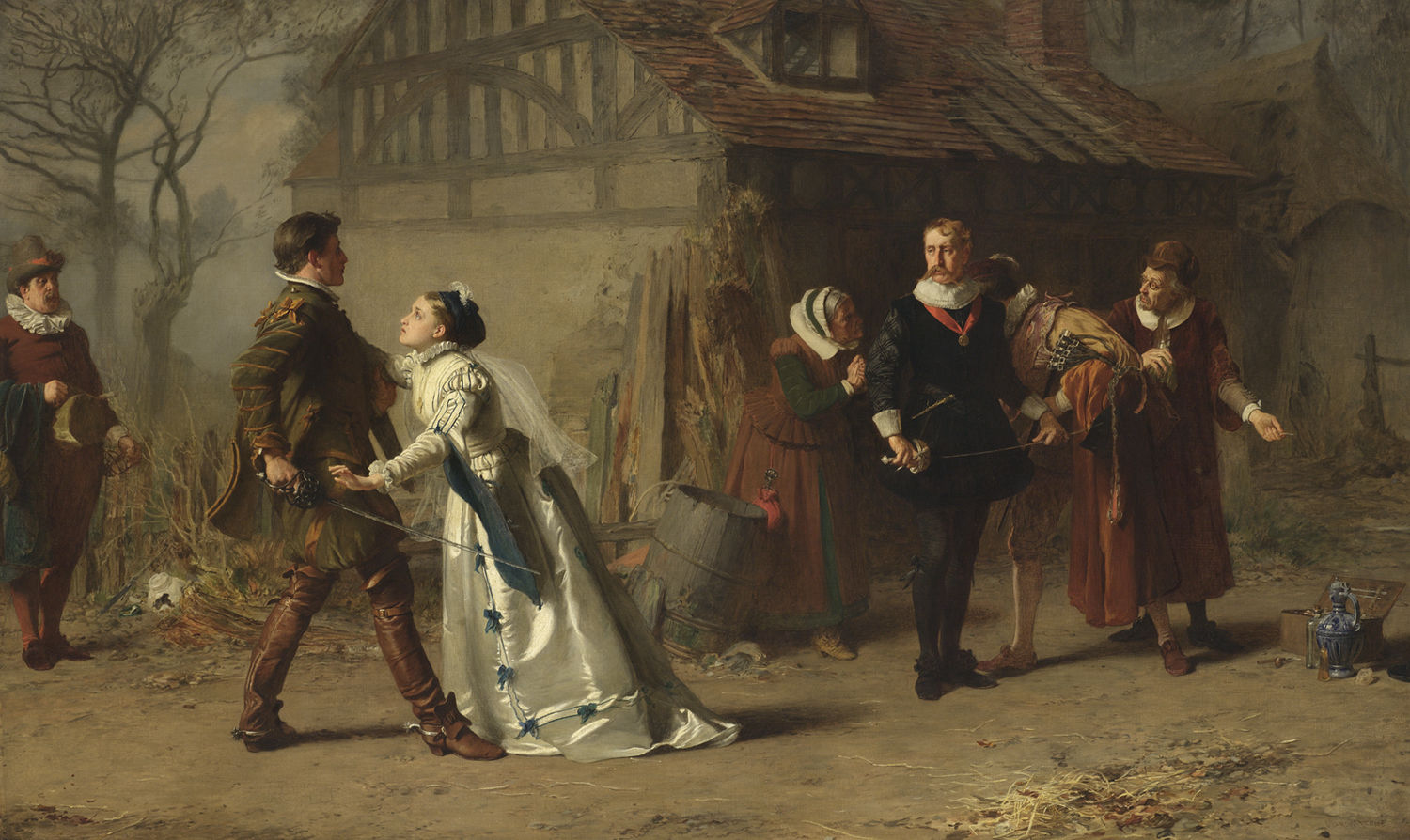
An Interrupted Duel (1868)

Le Roi est mort, Vive le Roi! (1873)

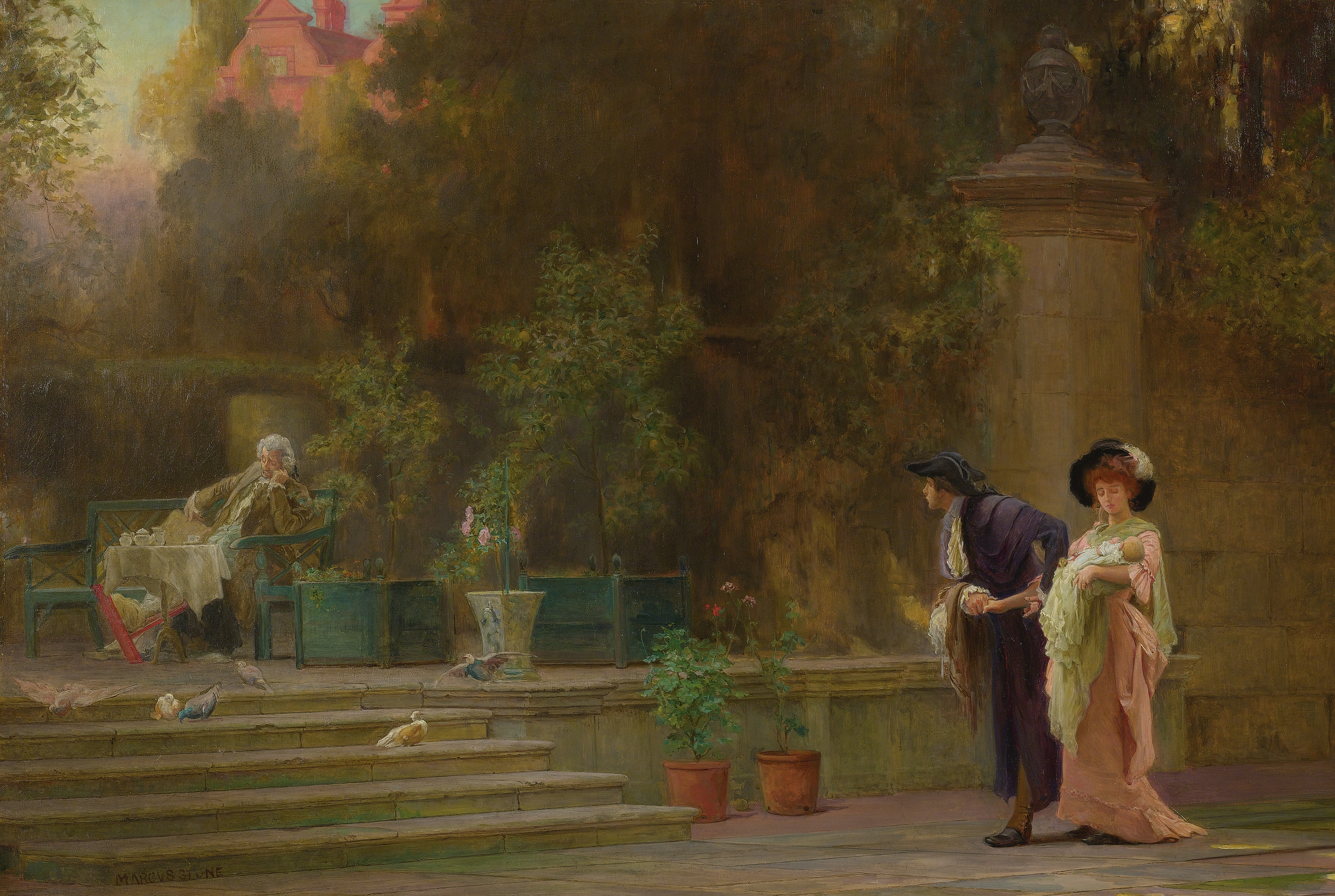
Married for Love

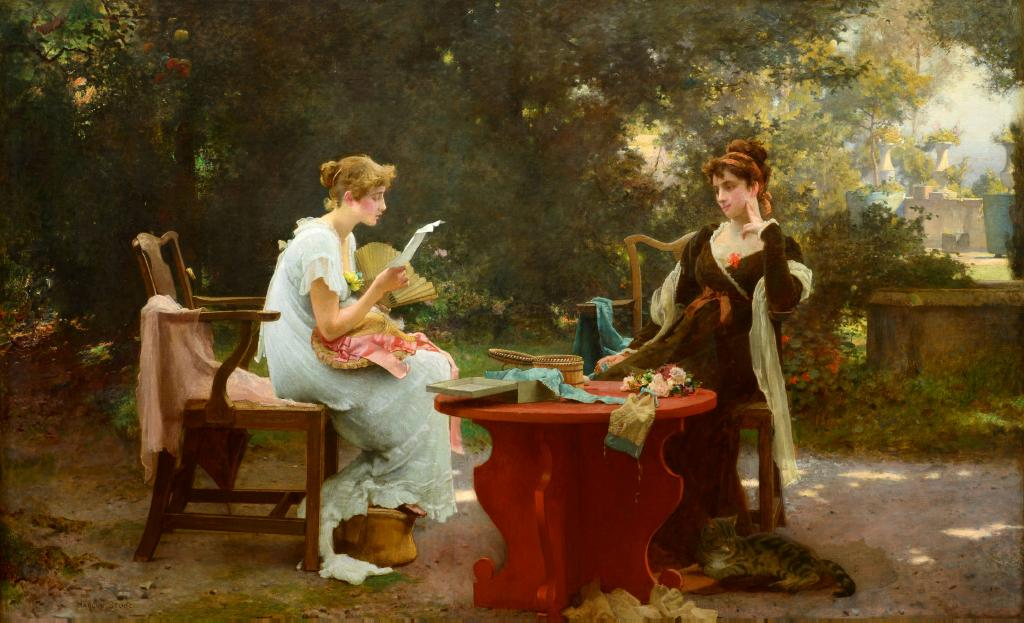
Her First Love Letter

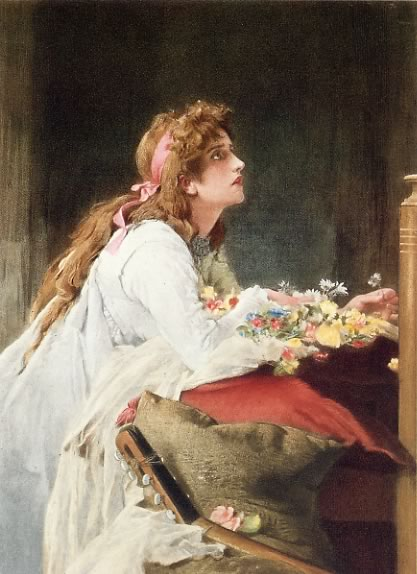
Ophelia (1888)

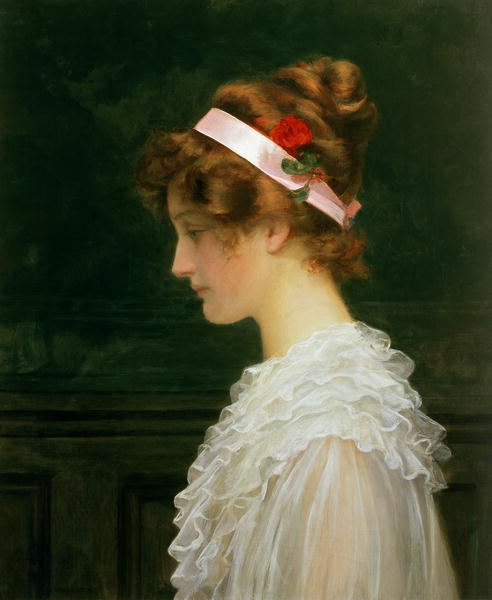
Portrait of a Girl (1880)

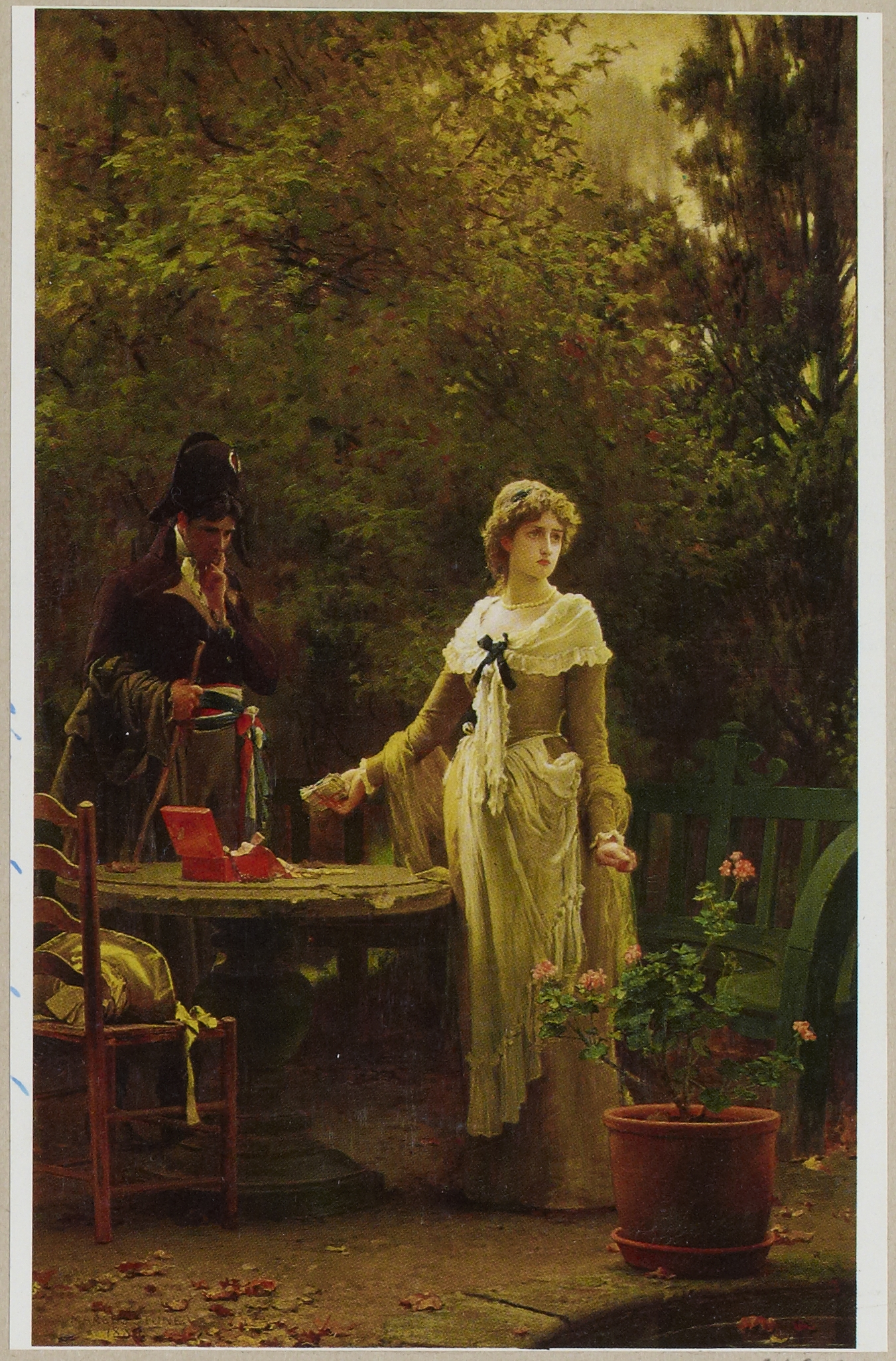
Amour ou Patrie (1880)

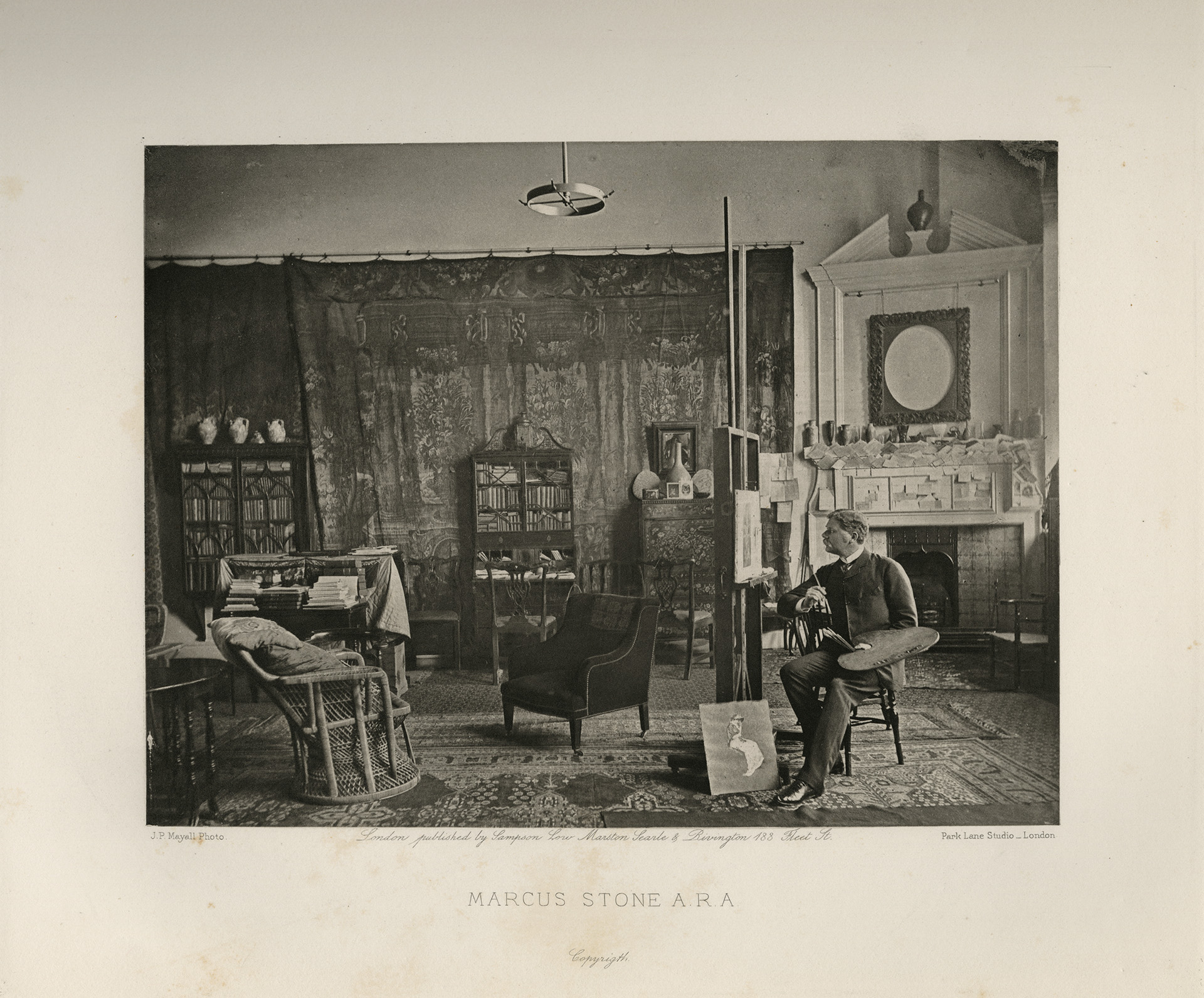
Marcus Stone by J. P. Mayall from Artists at Home, photogravure, published 1884, Department of Image Collections, National Gallery of Art Library, Washington, DC

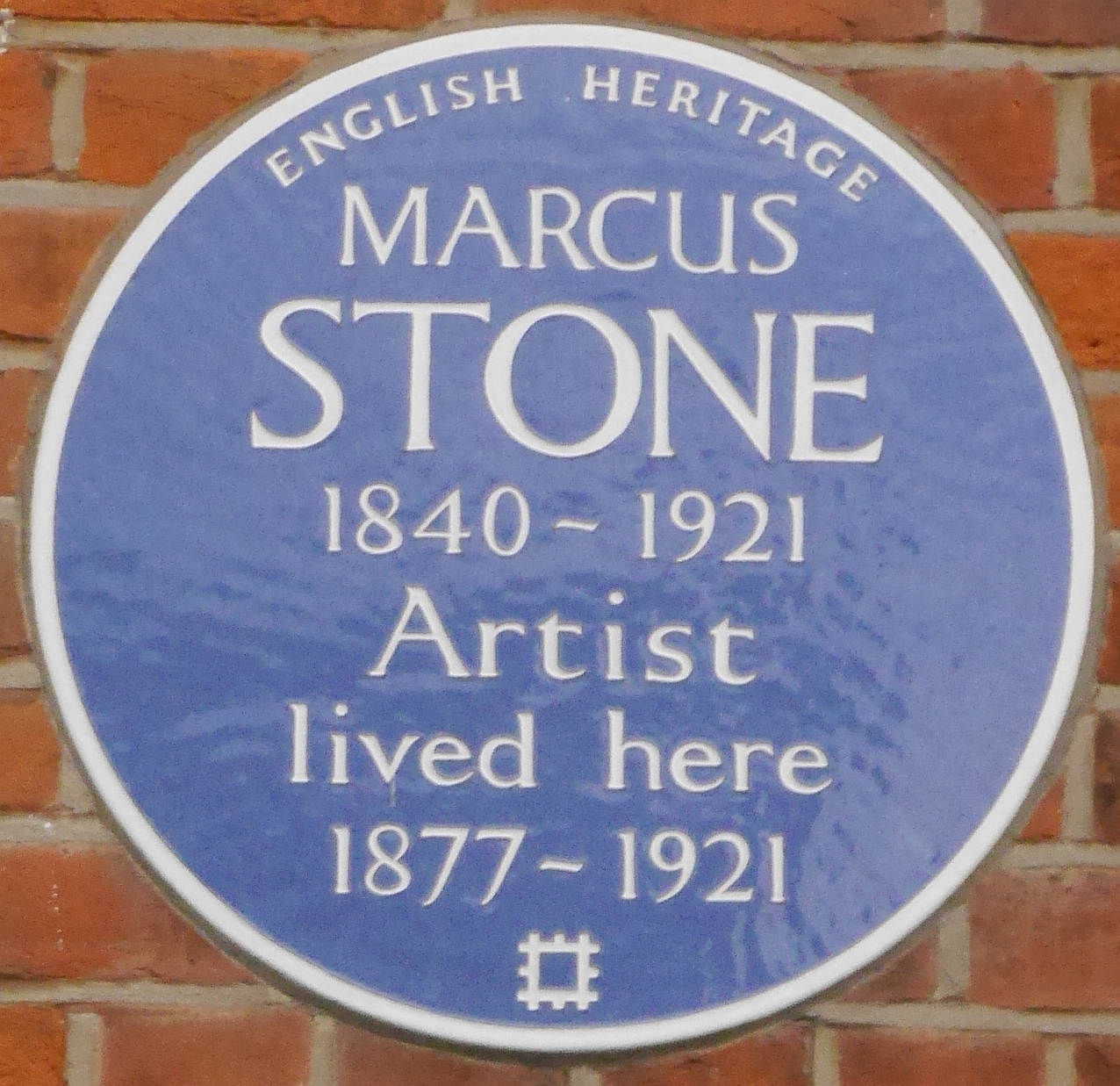
Blue plaque in Holland Park, London
