= George Bernard O'Neill =

Irish genre painter

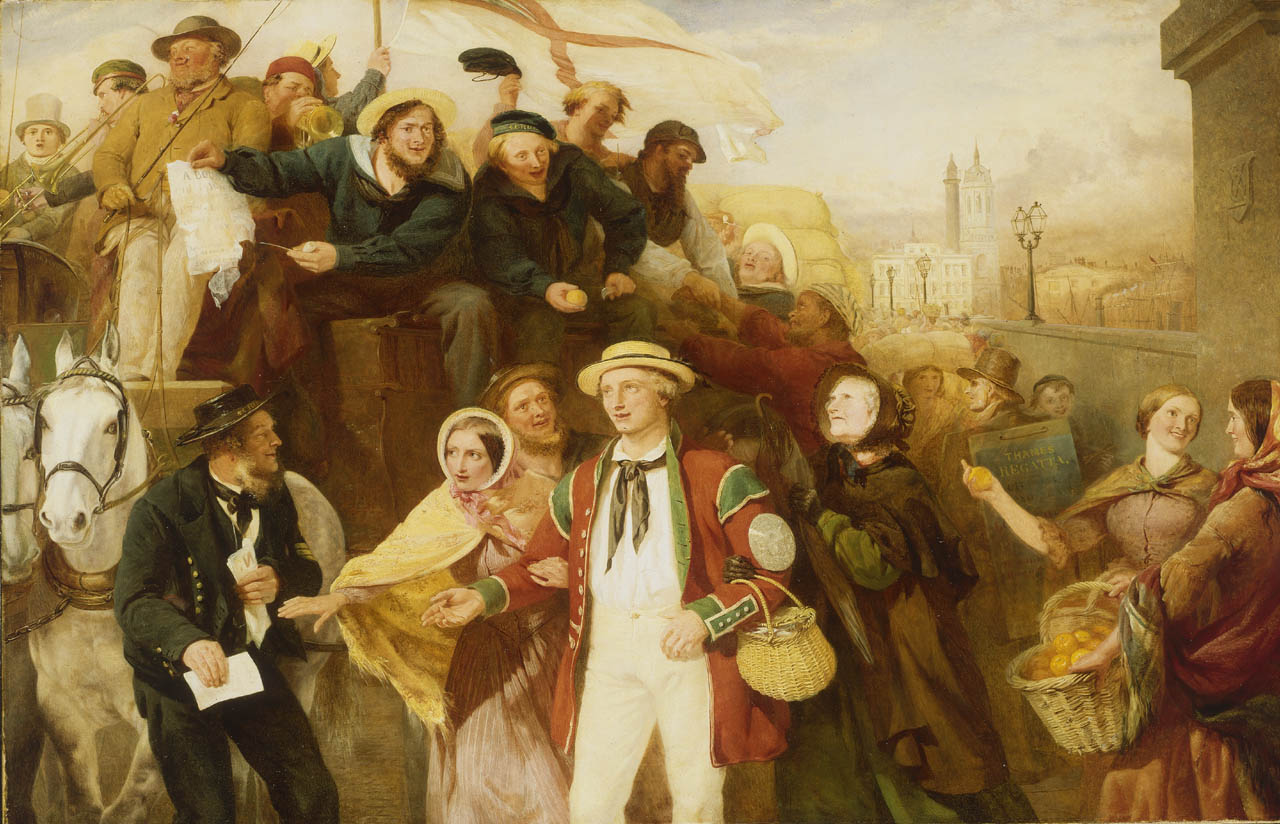
Manning the Navy (c. 1860)

George Bernard O'Neill (17 July 1828 – 23 September 1917), was a prolific Irish genre painter, from 1859 a member of the Cranbrook Colony of artists.

== Life and work ==
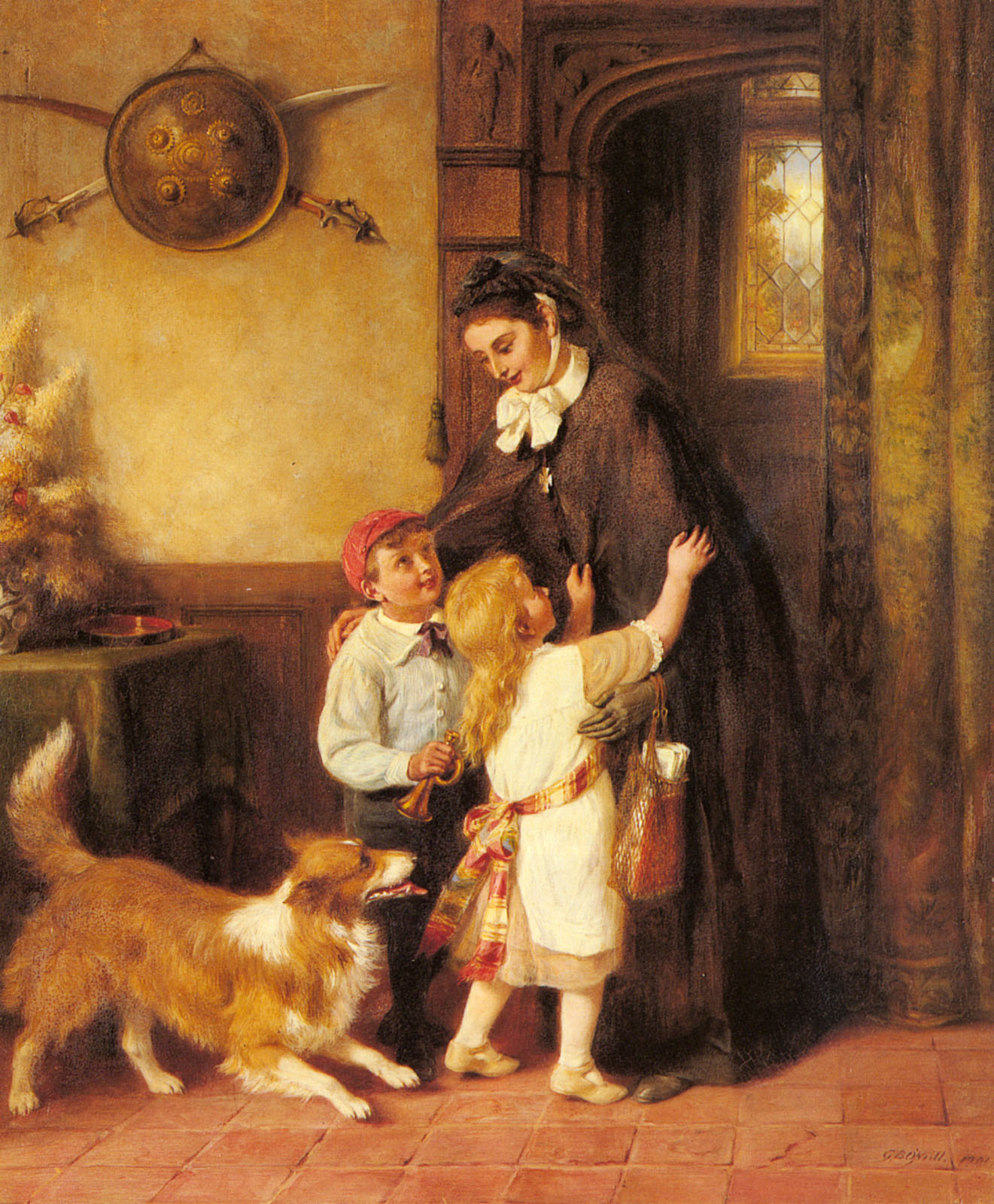
A Joyful Welcome (1901)

O'Neill was born in Dublin in Ireland, the ninth of fifteen children of a Dublin Ordnance clerk. He arrived in England in 1837, went to school in Woolwich and was accepted at the Royal Academy Schools in 1845. He was a successful student, regularly exhibited at the Royal Academy from 1847 onwards, and gained a reputation as a painter of charming narrative scenes. 'The Foundling', exhibited in 1852, demonstrated his awareness of works by Old Masters combined with the appealing subject of an orphaned child.

In 1855 O'Neill married Emma Stuart Callcott, a cousin of John Callcott Horsley. Through this marriage he entered Horsley's artistic circle and by 1859 was introduced to the Cranbrook Colony. Next year George and Emma leased a medieval timber-framed, 'Old Wilsley House', about one mile away from the town of Cranbrook and maintained it as a summer home and studio for many years. It became a setting for many of O'Neill's paintings.

O' Neill's artistic manner was similar to that of Thomas Webster and Frederick Daniel Hardy. The close relationship between O'Neill and Hardy can be judged from their little painting 'The Surprise' where Hardy painted the interior and O'Neill - the figure (Wolverhampton Art Gallery).

Scenes of rural life - virtuous, innocent, sometimes slightly comical, sometimes sentimental, painted on small domestic scale, appealed to middle-class customers. The height of his success was in the 1850s-1870s, when his works were eagerly collected by Midlands industrialists and the entrepreneurs of other industrial regions of the country. This feeling of public success was expressed in O'Neill's painting 'Public Opinion', which had been shown at the Royal Academy in 1863 (at present at the Leeds City Art Gallery).

O’Neill also kept a home and studio in London, where he spent the winter months participating in the capital's artistic life. In the 1870s, along with George Henry Boughton, he became friends with James McNeill Whistler and offered him moral support during the years 1877–78, when Whistler sued the critic John Ruskin for libel. Although O’Neill's artistic views were in many ways contrary to these of Whistler, they both believed that the artist's aesthetic purpose gave validity to a work of art.

Most of O’Neill's paintings associated with the Cranbrook Colony look like sentimental depictions of children and rustic families, but they might have been intended for more serious purpose. It was noticed that

"children can be used to publicize the iniquities of the social system without seeming to attack the social structure; reform might well be achieved by appeals to the conscience through sentiment rather than by reasoned argument and criticism of an overly political character."

If so, O'Neill's images of children can be seen in the context of Dickens’ novels as a part of the social movements of that time.

The following decades saw a significant decline in the quality of his works and in their popularity. He died in London on 23 September 1917, just two months into his 89th year, having not exhibited for the last 24 years of his life.

== Gallery ==
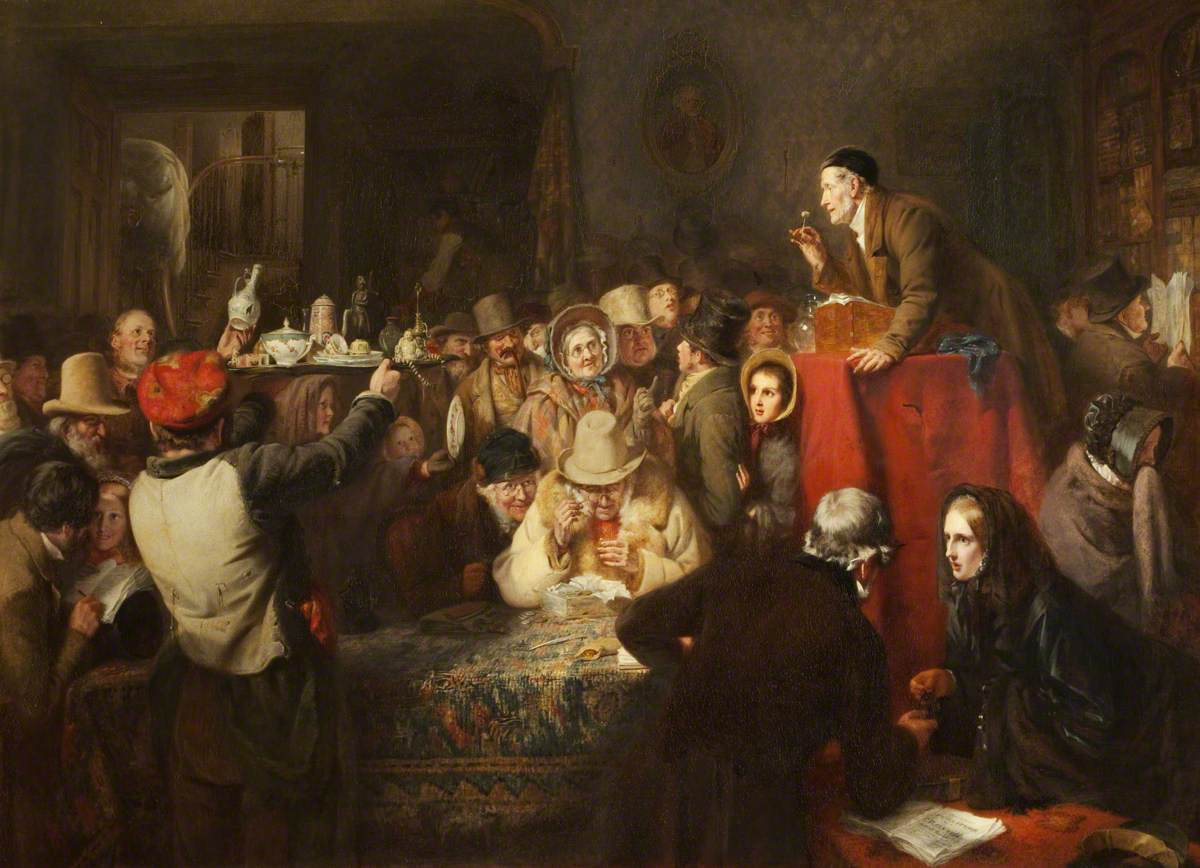
The Last Day of the Sale, 1857

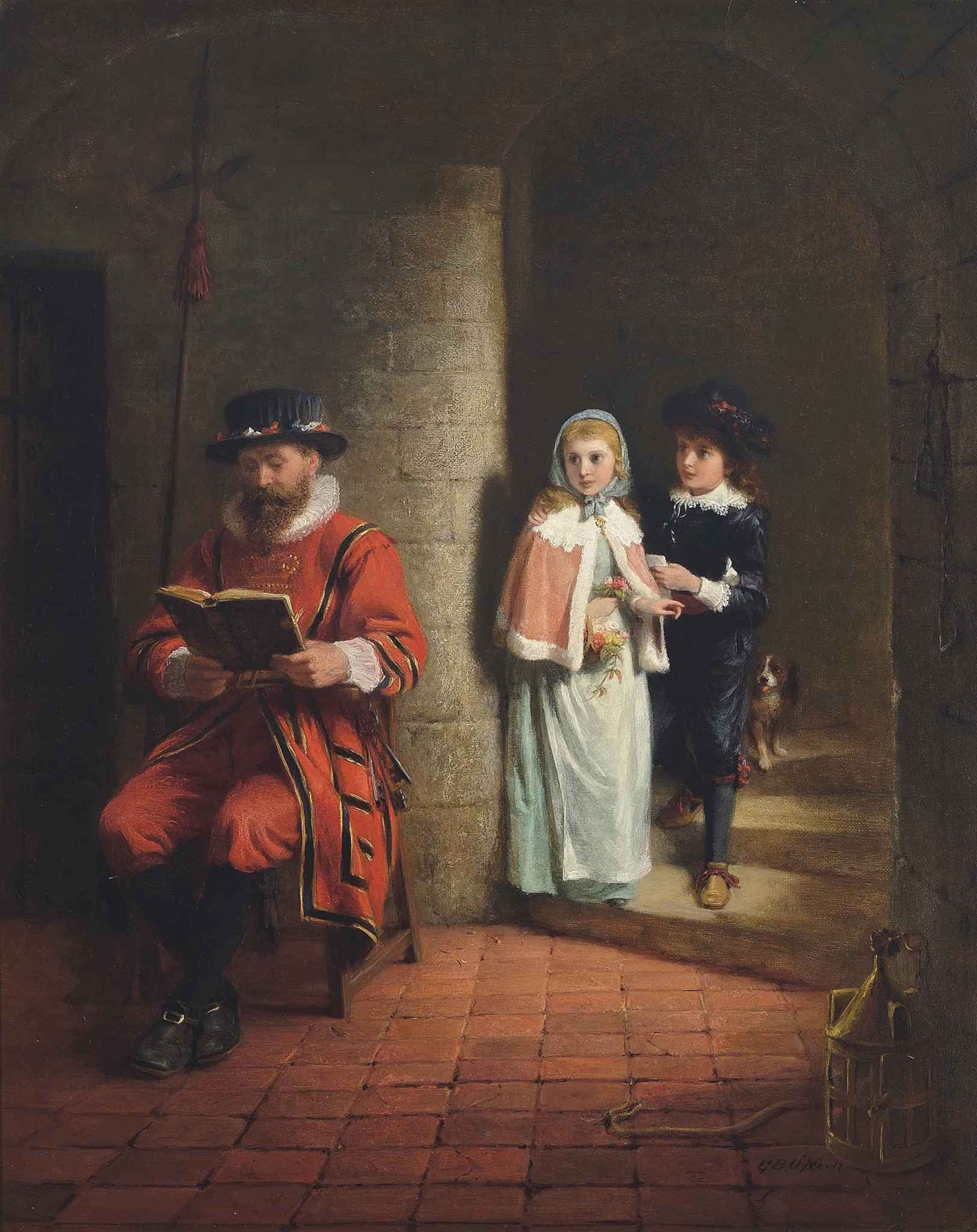
Children at the Tower, 1862

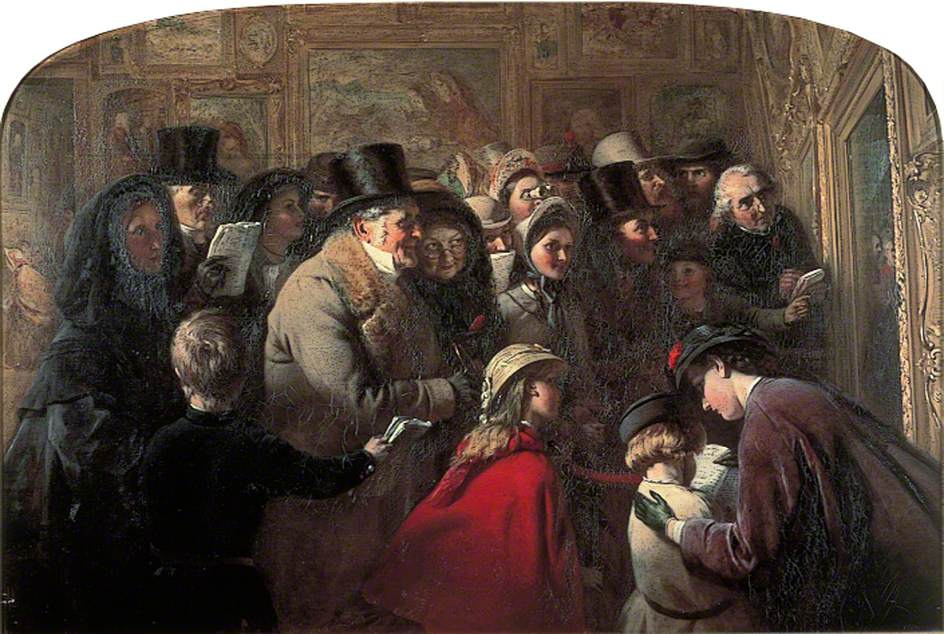
Public Opinion, 1863

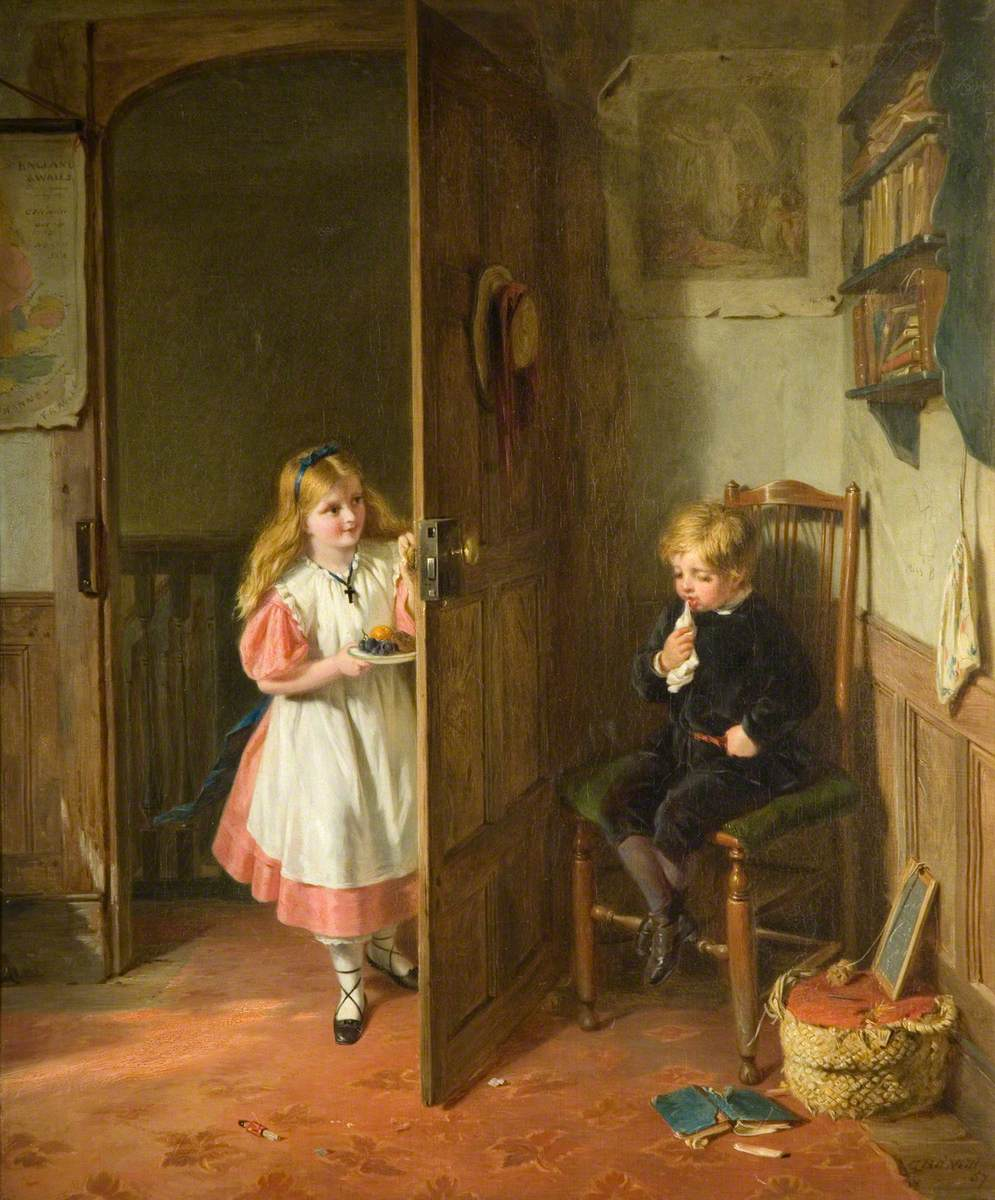
The Naughty Boy, 1867

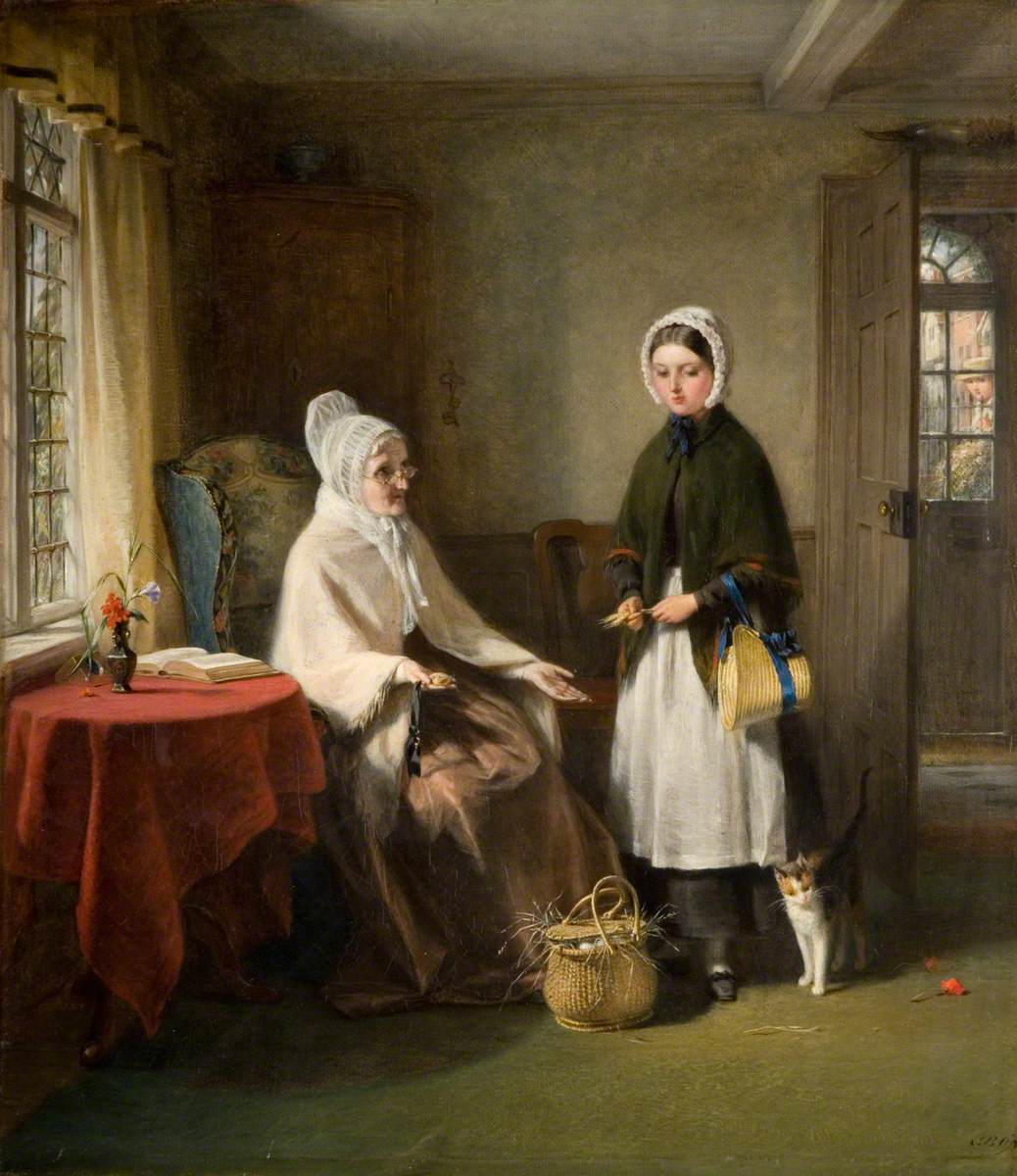
The Reproof, 1867

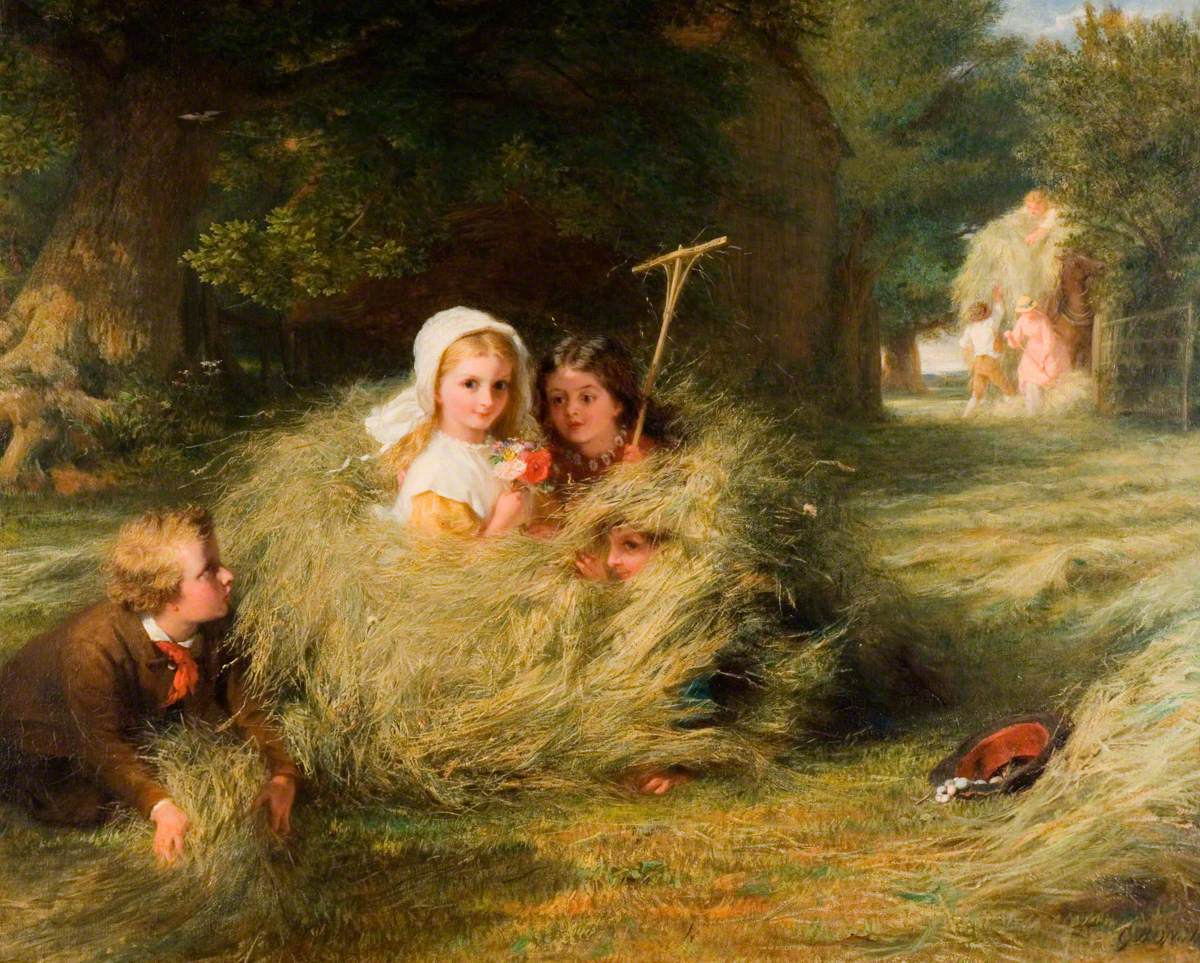
Nestlings, 1870

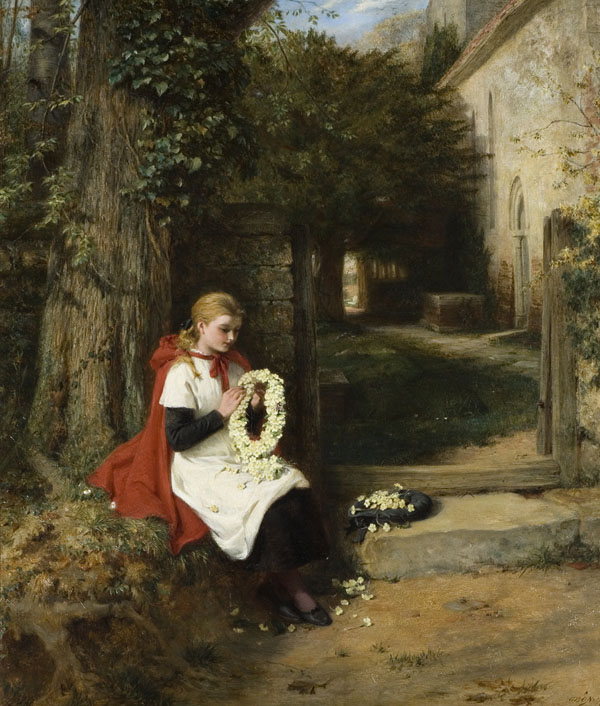
Not Forgotten, 1882
