= On the Road from Waterloo to Paris =

Painting by Marcus Stone

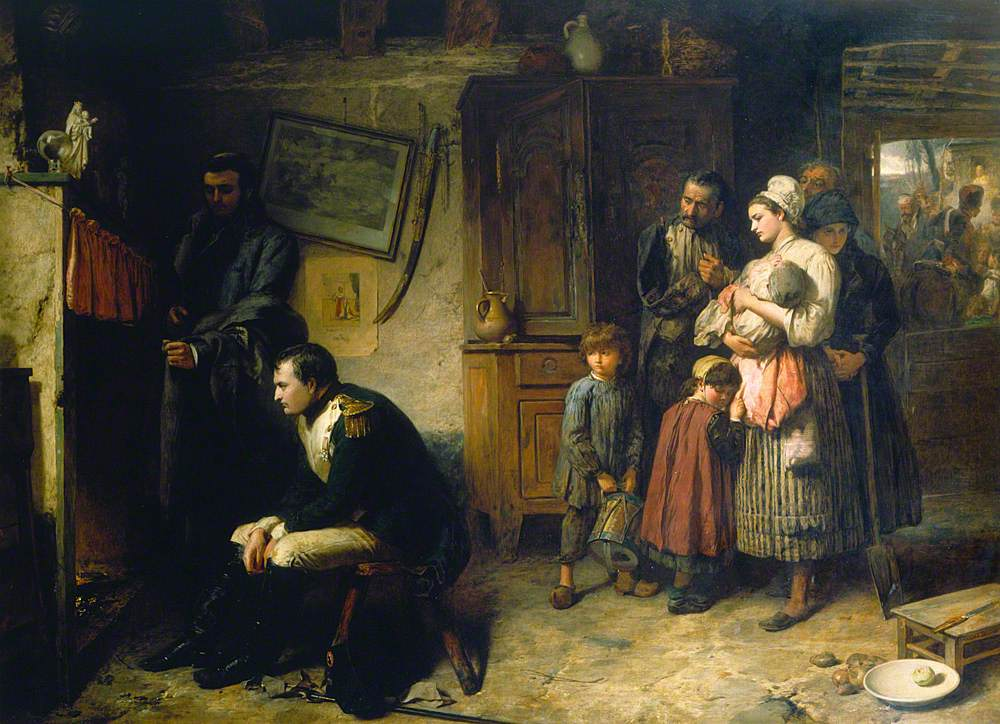
- Artist: Marcus Stone
- Year: 1863
- Type: Oil on canvas, history painting
- Dimensions: 112 cm × 142 cm (44 in × 56 in)
- Location: Guildhall Art Gallery, London

On the Road from Waterloo to Paris is an 1863 history painting by the British artist Marcus Stone. It depicts a scene from 1815 during the Hundred Days campaign. The French Emperor Napoleon, defeated at the Battle of Waterloo, has left his army and is taking shelter at a house on the road back to Paris. Dejected, he kneels to warm himself by the fireside. Napoleon abdicated shortly afterwards bringing an end to the Napoleonic Wars.

Stone was noted for his scenes, often with vague historical settings. This painting is of an imagined scene but is based on a specific historical context. The work was displayed at the Royal Academy Exhibition of 1863. The painting is now in the collection of the Guildhall Art Gallery in London, having been bequeathed in 1902 by the art collector Charles Gassiot.

== Bibliography ==
- Lübbren, Nina. Narrative Painting in Nineteenth-century Europe. Manchester University Press, 2023.
- Roe, Sonia & Hardy, Pat. Oil Paintings in Public Ownership in the City of London. Public Catalogue Foundation, 2009.
- Wright, Christopher, Gordon, Catherine May & Smith, Mary Peskett. British and Irish Paintings in Public Collections: An Index of British and Irish Oil Paintings by Artists Born Before 1870 in Public and Institutional Collections in the United Kingdom and Ireland. Yale University Press, 2006.
